The Assassin's Creed media franchise, which primarily consists of a series of open-world action-adventure stealth video games published by Ubisoft, features an extensive cast of characters in its historical fiction and science fiction-based narratives. The series also encompasses a wide variety of media outside of video games, including novels, comic books, board games, animated films, a live-action film, and an upcoming Netflix television series. The series features original characters intertwined with real-world historical events and figures, and is centered on a fictional millennia-old struggle for peace between the Assassin Brotherhood, inspired by the real-life Order of Assassins, who fight for peace and free will and embody the concept of chaos; and the Templar Order, inspired by the real-life Knights Templar, who desire peace through control over all of humanity, and embody the concept of order. A convention established by the first game involves the player experiencing the lives of these characters as part of a simulation played by a protagonist from the modern day, using technology known as the Animus developed by Abstergo Industries, a corporate front of the Templar Order in the modern era.

The first five games feature modern-day protagonist Desmond Miles, a direct descendant of their respective lead characters who are members of familial lines that had sworn an allegiance to the Assassins. By exploring his ancestors' memories, Desmond searches for powerful artifacts called "Pieces of Eden", which are connected to the Isu, a precursor race that created humanity to serve them and went extinct following a catastrophic event tens of thousands of years ago. However, they left behind clues to guide humanity to their technology, which could be used to prevent the same disaster from happening in the future. Following the events of Assassin's Creed III, Abstergo develops a more advanced version of the Animus technology called the Helix, which can explore the genetic memories of any historical individual using their DNA without relying on the user being a direct descendant of them. From Assassin's Creed IV: Black Flag to Assassin's Creed Syndicate, the player assumes control of unnamed research analysts working for the entertainment branch of Abstergo or the Assassin Brotherhood; the analysts are intended to be the embodiment of the player in the Assassin's Creed universe. From Assassin's Creed Origins to Assassin's Creed Valhalla, the modern-day protagonist is Layla Hassan, an ambitious former Abstergo employee who developed a portable version of Animus technology and is eventually recruited to the Brotherhood.

This article describes major historical and fictional characters that appear in the video games and the 2016 live-action film adaptation. Most games tend to feature standalone or self-contained stories told within a fictionalized version of real-world historical civilizations, with at least one lead character from that setting and time period. However, some games are more interconnected than others, as is the case with the "Ezio Trilogy", consisting of Assassin's Creed II, Brotherhood, and Revelations. These games feature interconnected characters and plot points, so to avoid listing a character multiple times, this article only takes into account their first or most significant appearance and describes their entire history there.

Modern-day characters

Desmond Miles saga

Desmond Miles 

Desmond Miles (13 March 1987 – 21 December 2012) (voiced by Nolan North) is the protagonist of the modern-day sections of the first five main games in the series. Born into the Assassin Brotherhood, he is a direct descendant of several prominent historical Assassins, including Aquilus, Altaïr Ibn-La'Ahad, Ezio Auditore da Firenze, Edward Kenway, and Ratonhnaké:ton / Connor. Desmond was trained as an Assassin by his father, William, from a young age, but did not believe in the existence of the Assassins or the Templars and eventually ran away from home at the age of 16. He becomes a bartender in New York City, only to be abducted by Abstergo in 2012 because of his heritage. Desmond is forced to relive the memories of Altaïr to help Abstergo locate undiscovered Pieces of Eden, but eventually escapes with the Assassins' help. He then begins reliving Ezio and Connor's memories, to gain their skills through the "bleeding effect"—a side effect of the Animus where the user's memories blend in with their ancestor's—and to find more Pieces of Eden. Initially, this is to keep them out of the Templars' hands; after Desmond is warned by the Isu of the disaster that wiped them out, which referenced the 2012 phenomenon, he begins searching for the Isu's Grand Temple, which contains the technology to prevent it. Desmond eventually succeeds in his mission, but is killed by the Isu's technology while saving the planet. After his death, Abstergo uses DNA samples recovered from his body to continue their Animus projects. In Assassin's Creed Valhalla, it is revealed that Desmond did not truly die in 2012 but that his consciousness was transported into "The Grey", a digital afterlife created by the Isu, where he became a being of pure light called The Reader. He forgot his original identity and was tasked with analyzing various branching timelines to find ways of preventing future disasters.

Lucy Stillman 
Lucy Stillman (1988 – 10 October 2012) (voiced by Kristen Bell) is a member of the modern-day Assassin Brotherhood and genetic memory researcher for Abstergo Industries' Animus Project. During her infiltration of Abstergo, she reports on the company's recent activities to the Assassins. However, Lucy's lengthy separation from the Assassins and her distrust for William Miles leads her to defect to the Templar cause prior to 2011. When Desmond Miles is brought into Abstergo for testing, Warren instructs Lucy to earn Desmond's trust so that the Templars can find the Piece of Eden located within his memories and use it for their Eye-Abstergo satellite. As Desmond's condition begins to worsen, Warren and Lucy resort to more drastic measures, and formulate Project Siren. Lucy is ordered to take Desmond somewhere he would feel safe, and the two Templars orchestrate Desmond and her escape from Abstergo. Lucy carries out her orders and relocates Desmond to a hideout to join his fellow Assassins Shaun Hastings and Rebecca Crane. After a month and another relocation to the ruined Villa Auditore in Monteriggioni, the Assassin team discovers the location of an Apple of Eden, which is inside the Colosseum Vault. When Desmond's hand makes contact with the Apple, his body is possessed by the Isu Juno. With her knowledge of Lucy's true allegiance, Juno forces Desmond to stab and kill Lucy with his Hidden Blade. Desmond would later learn of Lucy's betrayal while involuntarily reliving the memories of Clay Kaczmarek, Subject 16 of the Animus Project.

Warren Vidic 
Dr. Warren Vidic (died 14 December 2012) (voiced by Philip Proctor) is the head of the Abstergo's Animus project and a member of the Inner Sanctum of the Templar Order. In Assassin's Creed: Bloodstone, he is introduced to Abstergo Industries by William King Harvey, a CIA director and double agent for the Templar Order. He inherits the Bluebird project from Colonel Boris Pash, which is the precursor of the Animus project. As the head of research for Abstergo, Vidic is put in charge of the genetic memory research and the Animus project. As the one responsible for finding new subjects for the Animus, Warren has them explore their genetic memories, which he would then analyze to gain information on both the Assassins and the Pieces of Eden. As a high-ranking employee of Abstergo Industries, Warren is also one of the few members of the Inner Sanctum, a group of Templars with full awareness of the Orders' plans for their "New World". He plays an important role in those plans, being tasked with finding a Piece of Eden to power Eye-Abstergo, a satellite which uses the Piece of Eden's power to control humanity. In Assassin's Creed, Vidic experiments on Desmond Miles with the Animus, forcing him to relive the memories of Altaïr Ibn-La'Ahad so that Abstergo can obtain a map showing the locations of countless Pieces of Eden around the globe. Following Desmond's escape from Abstergo in Assassin's Creed II, Vidic leads several agents to attack the Assassins' hideout in an attempt to re-capture him, though this attack fails and Vidic is forced to flee. Afterwards, he shifts his focus to overseeing the training of a number of Templar agents through the Animus, as seen in the multiplayer modes in Assassin's Creed: Brotherhood and Assassin's Creed: Revelations. In Assassin's Creed III, after capturing William Miles, Vidic is killed by Desmond when the latter storms Abstergo's Rome facility to rescue his father. In Assassin's Creed IV: Black Flag, an e-mail sent by Abstergo Entertainment COO Olivier Garneau reveals that Warren had volunteered as Subject 2 for his Animus Project, where he relived the life of an ancestor in 18th-century Hungary and of one of Joan of Arc's executioners in 1431.

Shaun Hastings 
Shaun Hastings (born 1985) (voiced by Danny Wallace) is a cynical, condescending, and pessimistic member of the modern-day Assassin Brotherhood, specializing in research and information handling. He is introduced as a member of Lucy Stillman's team that helps Desmond in his mission to find Pieces of Eden and save the world. Through conversations in Assassin's Creed II, Desmond learns that Shaun was interested in conspiracies from an early age, and developed a love of history. Although he was unaware of the existence of modern-day Templars and Assassins, Shaun realized that there was some sort of power struggle going on. Shaun attempted to tell others about his findings, not realizing that the Templars would try to silence him. Rebecca Crane "rescued" Shaun and recruited him into the Brotherhood. This is mentioned as being unconventional, as most Assassins are born into the Order, not recruited. In 2013, following Desmond's death, Shaun infiltrates Abstergo by working as a coffee vendor at their Entertainment subsidiary in Montreal to find out what happened to Desmond's body. A year later, Shaun (under the alias "Deacon") and Bishop enlist the help of a Helix player to locate the remains of a Sage during the French Revolution. In 2015, with the help of the same player, Shaun and Rebecca infiltrate Abstergo's London headquarters and locate the Shroud of Eden hidden in a vault underneath the city, but lose it to the Templars after a struggle. In 2020, Shaun and Rebecca are assigned to work with Layla Hassan in investigating the strange strengthening of Earth's magnetic field, and later meet Basim Ibn Ishaq, whom they put in contact with William Miles.

Rebecca Crane 
Rebecca Crane (born 1984)  (voiced by Eliza Schneider) is a member of the modern-day Assassin Brotherhood and the creator of the Animus 2.0, which she affectionately refers to as "Baby". She is introduced in Assassin's Creed II as a member of Lucy Stillman's team and works with Desmond towards finding Pieces of Eden and saving the world. She provides technical support for the other members of the Brotherhood alongside her fellow Assassin, Shaun. After Desmond's death, Rebecca works with Shaun to infiltrate Abstergo Entertainment as a courier. In 2015, Rebecca and Shaun head to London with fellow Assassin Galina Voronina to locate and extract the Shroud of Eden. Their efforts fail, and Rebecca is wounded when she takes a shot meant for Shaun. The trio manages to escape after Galina dispatches most of the Abstergo agents surrounding them. In 2020, Rebecca and Shaun are assigned to work with Layla Hassan in investigating the strange strengthening of Earth's magnetic field, and later meet Basim Ibn Ishaq, whom they put in contact with William Miles.

William Miles 
William Miles (born 1948)  (voiced by John de Lancie) is Desmond's estranged father and de facto leader of the modern-day Assassin Brotherhood, having risen to the position following the death of the previous Mentor in 2000. He raised Desmond in the ways of the Assassins, teaching him about the order and what they fight for. William's first appearance is in the ending scene of Assassin's Creed: Brotherhood, where he can be heard telling his fellow Assassins to put Desmond in the Animus to save his mind after the latter has fallen into a coma. In Assassin's Creed: Revelations, he can be heard talking with Rebecca and Shaun during Desmond's time in the Animus Black Room, explaining Desmond's importance to the Assassins due to his ability to wield the Apple of Eden properly. He questions Rebecca and Shaun if Desmond and Lucy were close, and feels sad about Lucy's death. He is the first person to greet Desmond after recovering from his coma. In Assassin's Creed III, William and his team arrive at the Isu Grand Temple and search for power cells to activate it while Desmond is in the Animus, exploring his ancestors' memories to find the key to the Temple's Inner Chambers. He is captured by Abstergo agents in Egypt while attempting to retrieve a power cell and is taken to their facility in Rome. Desmond infiltrates the facility and rescues William, reconciling with him in the process. Following Desmond's death, a grief-stricken William retires from the position of Mentor of the Brotherhood and goes into hiding, but eventually reclaims the title in 2015. In Assassin's Creed Origins, William travels to Egypt to recruit Layla Hassan to the Assassins. In Assassin's Creed Valhalla, William meets Basim Ibn Ishaq at the latter's request and agrees to work with him to further the Assassins' goals, though not before demanding a sample of Basim's genetic material, to allows the Assassins to observe Basim's genetic memories and be convinced of his motives.

Clay Kaczmarek (Subject 16) 
Clay Kaczmarek  (1982 – 8 August 2012) (voiced by Cam Clarke in Assassin's Creed II and Assassin's Creed: Brotherhood and by Graham Cuthbertson in Assassin's Creed: Revelations), also known as Subject 16 of the Animus Project, is a member of the modern-day Assassin Brotherhood and descendant of Ezio Auditore da Firenze. Born into a family of engineers, Clay faces psychological problems due to developmental disorders and his father's neglectful attitude, and runs into the Assassins while looking for acceptance. As a member of the Brotherhood, Clay's most important mission is to infiltrate Abstergo Industries as a subject of the Animus Project to obtain more information on the Animus. Labeled Subject 16, Clay is forced to relive the memories of his ancestors via his genetic memory. When Clay finds out that his teammate, Lucy Stillman—who infiltrated Abstergo years before and was tasked with getting Clay out of Abstergo safely—had abandoned their cause to join their enemies, the Templars, Clay spends days and hours of sessions inside the Animus. Since it leaves his mind incapable of separating his own personality from those of his ancestors, Clay becomes mentally unstable to the point that he commits suicide. After his alleged death, Clay continues to exist as an AI recreation of his personality within the Animus, and is able to manipulate much of the Animus' programming from within to help Desmond. In Assassin's Creed: Revelations, when the Animus begins to delete excess data after Desmond achieves full synchronization with Altaïr and Ezio, Clay sacrifices himself to help Desmond escape the Animus, though not before passing on his genetic memories to him.

Daniel Cross 
Daniel Cross (9 March 1974 – 14 December 2012) (voiced by Danny Blanco-Hall) is a member of the Templar Order and a sleeper agent tasked with infiltrating the Assassin Brotherhood to assassinate its Mentor. He is the grandson of Innokenti Orelov and the great-grandson of Nikolai Orelov, a prominent a member of the Russian Assassin Brotherhood. Cross is responsible for the Great Purge of 2000, in which most of the modern Assassin Brotherhood was killed. He is introduced as the modern-day protagonist of the comic book series Assassin's Creed: The Fall, and makes his first on-screen appearance in Assassin's Creed III, where he is assigned the task of hunting down Desmond Miles. Cross is ultimately killed by Desmond when the latter storms Abstergo's Rome facility to rescue his father.

Research analyst / Helix player saga

Erudito 
Erudito is a hacking collective that works against Abstergo Industries, being aware of its true nature. The collective's primary goal is to expose the truths censored by Abstergo in its products, to make the general public aware of the Assassin-Templar conflict. This can be seen in Assassin's Creed III: Liberation, where they contact the unnamed player character during their playthrough of Abstergo's newest video game, Liberation, and help them uncensor it. Because of their similar goals, Erudito would at times work with the Assassins against the Templars.

Abstergo research analyst 
The Abstergo research analyst, nicknamed "Noob", is the modern-day protagonist of Assassin's Creed IV: Black Flag. They are never seen or referred to by name, being controlled from a first-person perspective. In 2013, the analyst is hired by Abstergo Entertainment, a subsidiary of Abstergo Industries that produces multimedia goods to be sold to the general public, and is assigned to work on the Sample 17 Project, consisting of various products based on the genetic memories of the late Desmond Miles' ancestors. The analyst relives the memories of Edward Kenway to collect footage for an upcoming interactive film, but during their work, they are contacted by John Standish, who persuades them to investigate Abstergo and recover sensitive information on the company, which is then delivered to Shaun Hastings and Rebecca Crane to help the Assassins. Although the analyst soon becomes suspicious of John's motives, they are blackmailed into pushing forward, eventually hacking a terminal which would allow Juno to come back to life by possessing someone. However, Juno is not strong enough yet to possess the analyst, so John tries to weaken them with poison, but is killed by Abstergo's security forces before he could do so. The analyst is then allowed to return to work, as evidence found on John's computer implicated him as the sole person responsible for the hacks. However, they would eventually resign by November 2014.

Helix research analyst 
The Helix research analyst, nicknamed "Numbskull", is the modern-day protagonist of Assassin's Creed Rogue. Similarly to the analyst from Assassin's Creed IV: Black Flag, they are never seen or referred to by name, and are controlled from a first-person perspective. In 2014, they are hired by Abstergo Entertainment to use their Helix software to relive the memories of Shay Patrick Cormac, but inadvertently trips a hidden memory file that infects the Animus servers. After cleaning them, the analyst is thanked for their services, and invited to join the Templar Order, or be killed to keep the order's existence secret; their decision is not revealed.

Helix player / The Initiate 
The Helix player, referred to as "The Initiate" after their induction into the Assassin Brotherhood, is the modern-day protagonist of Assassin's Creed Unity and Assassin's Creed Syndicate. They are an individual contacted by the Assassins through their agent, Bishop, to help them on at least two separate occasions: once in 2014, when they located the body of François-Thomas Germain, an 18th-century Sage, by reliving the memories of Arno Dorian through the Helix software they own; and again in 2015, when they relived Jacob and Evie Frye's memories to find the Shroud of Eden in London.

Melanie Lemay 
Melanie Lemay (voiced by Cristina Rosato) is the research analyst's supervisor at Abstergo Entertainment in Assassin's Creed IV: Black Flag and a member of the Templar Order. In 2013, she is assigned to oversee the Sample 17 Project alongside Olivier Garneau. Sometime between Garneau's disappearance and the events of Assassin's Creed Rogue in 2014, she is promoted to CCO.

Olivier Garneau 
Oliviear Garneau (died 30 May 2014) (voiced by Vincent Hoss-Desmarais)  is the CCO of Abstergo Entertainment and a member of the Templar Order. In 2013, he is ordered by Laetitia England, the Head of the Operations Division of Abstergo Industries, to use the Sample 17 Project to locate the Observatory for the Templars. Later, while en route to a shareholders meeting in Chicago, he goes missing and is never heard from again. In Assassin's Creed Origins, it is revealed that he was killed by a fixer, likely hired by the Assassin Brotherhood.

John Standish 
John Standish (16 August 1975 – 26 November 2013) (voiced by Oliver Milburn) is the head of the IT department at Abstergo Entertainment's Montreal facility and a member of the Instruments of the First Will, a cult of followers of Juno who seek to bring her back to life. He is also a Sage, the reincarnation of Juno's husband Aita. During his work at Abstergo, he uses other employees, to whom he grants access to restricted areas of the company, to retrieve sensitive information and deliver it to the Assassins, while covering his own involvement. In 2013, during the events of Assassin's Creed IV: Black Flag, he does the same with the newly hired research analyst, but also secretly plots to have them possessed by Juno. However, when it comes time to put his plan into action, he discovers Juno is not strong enough to return yet. John then tries to poison the analyst to make them weak enough for Juno to enter their body, but is shot and killed by Abstergo's security forces.

Juhani Otso Berg 
Juhani Otso Berg (born 17 June 1985) (voiced by Andreas Apergis) is a high-ranking agent of the Operations Division of Abstergo Industries and a member of the Inner Sanctum of the Templar Order. After appearing as a faceless playable character in Assassin's Creed: Brotherhood's and Assassin's Creed: Revelations' multiplayer modes, he makes his on-screen debut in Assassin's Creed Rogue. A former a member of the Finnish Special Forces-turned-mercenary, Berg is approached by Warren Vidic in 2010 to join Abstergo, who in return provides cystic fibrosis treatment for his daughter. By 2012, Berg rises to the rank of Master Templar, joins the Inner Sanctum, and becomes the leader of Abstergo's elite commando unit, Sigma Team. Berg is the one who captures William in Cairo during the events of Assassin's Creed III. He also oversees the genetic research of Shay's memories in Assassin's Creed Rogue alongside Templar colleagues Violet de Costa and Melanie Lemay before aiding the Abstergo search for the Shroud of Eden in 2015 during Assassin's Creed Syndicate. During his work for Abstergo he crosses paths with and fights Shaun Hastings and Rebecca Crane, as well as Russian Master Assassin Galina Voronina. In 2018, during the events of Assassin's Creed Odyssey's The Fate of Atlantis DLC, Berg leads Sigma Team to Greece to kill Layla Hassan and retrieve the Staff of Hermes Trismegistus, but they are defeated and Berg himself is crippled by Layla with the Staff. He is then taken prisoner by the Assassins, but eventually returns to Abstergo, and regains use of his legs through experimentation with a Staff of Eden.

Violet da Costa 
Violet de Costa (14 June 1988 – August 2018) (voiced by Lucinda Davis) is a member of the Templar Order and Sigma Team's historical research specialist. She oversees the genetic research of Shay Cormac's memories during Assassin's Creed Rogue, guiding the Helix researcher and inviting them to join the Templar Order. She later participates in the search for the Shroud of Eden in 2015, accompanying Berg and Isabelle Ardant, and fighting off Shaun, Rebecca, and Galina who are also pursuing the Shroud. Distracted by Berg and the rest of Sigma Team, the Assassins are unable to stop Violet escaping with the Shroud. Violet is revealed to be a member of the Instruments of the First Will, a human cult devoted to returning humanity to obedience under the Isu, namely Juno. She is killed in 2018 by Berg for her betrayal during the fall of the Instruments of the First Will.

Bishop 
Bishop (voiced by Kate Todd) is a member of the modern-day Assassin Brotherhood who is responsible for directing Assassin activity across the globe, often to sabotage the Templars. When the Brotherhood requires sets of genetic memories explored to acquire data, she contacts various individuals around the world to do so, as seen in Assassin's Creed Unity and Assassin's Creed Syndicate.

Isabelle Ardant 
Isabelle Ardant (4 October 1969 – 25 October 2015) (voiced by Claudia Besso) is the Head of Historical Research at Abstergo Industries and a member of the Inner Sanctum of the Templar Order. In 2015, during the events of Assassin's Creed Syndicate, she leads the Templars' search for the Shroud of Eden in London, which culminates with a fight against Assassins Shaun Hastings, Rebecca Crane and Galina Voronina, who are also attempting to retrieve the Shroud. During the struggle, Ardant is stabbed and killed by Shaun.

Álvaro Gramática 
Álvaro Gramática (voiced by Marcel Jeannin) (4 April 1965 – August 2018) is the Director of Research of the Future Technology division of Abstergo Industries and a member of the Inner Sanctum of the Templar Order. As one of Abstergo's leading scientists, he is in charge of Phoenix Project, which is Abstergo's attempt to construct a living Isu, and has extensive knowledge of the Pieces of Eden. He is killed in 2018 during the fall of the Instruments of the First Will.

Galina Voronina 
Galina Voronina (born 30 July 1983) (voiced by Patricia Summersett) is a member of the Russian Brotherhood of Assassins. She appears as one of the main characters of the Assassin's Creed comic book series, and makes her on-screen debut in Assassin's Creed Syndicate.

Layla Hassan saga

Layla Hassan 
Layla Hassan (1984 – 16 August 2020) (voiced by Chantel Riley) is the modern-day protagonist of Assassin's Creed Origins, Assassin's Creed Odyssey, and Assassin's Creed Valhalla. Hailing from Egypt, Layla found work at Abstergo through Sofia Rikkin and created her own portable version of the Animus technology. However, she leaves the company in 2017, after Abstergo attempts to silence her for using the Animus to relive Bayek of Siwa's memories and learn about the origins of the Assassin Brotherhood. She is then recruited into the Brotherhood by William Miles, and begins searching for Pieces of Eden that would benefit the Assassins. In 2018, she finds the lost Isu city of Atlantis, where she receives the Staff of Hermes Trismegistus from Kassandra. However, while training with the Staff under the supervision of the Isu Aletheia, she loses control and accidentally kills her friend and fellow Assassin Victoria Bibeau. This incident deeply affects Layla, and, filled with guilt and remorse, she becomes depressed and starts a self-destructive lifestyle, such as smoking and drinking. It also strains her relationship with the other Assassins, and by 2020, she is reassigned to an Assassin cell with Shaun Hastings and Rebecca Crane. While investigating the strange strengthening of Earth's magnetic field, Layla relives the memories of Eivor Varinsdottir to find an Isu temple in Norway, which contains the technology to save the planet from destruction. Armed with the Staff, which protects her from the radiation inside the temple, Layla enters "The Grey", a digital afterlife created by the Isu, where she works with "The Reader" to restore the Earth's magnetic field to its proper strength. However, having dropped the Staff when she entered the Grey, Layla's physical body dies, and she chooses to stay with the Reader and help him explore various branching timelines to prevent future disasters.

Deanna Geary 
Deanna Geary (died October 2017) is a member of Abstergo's Medical Team working at their Lineage Discovery and Acquisition facility in Philadelphia, and Layla Hassan's best friend. In 2017, the two are sent to Egypt to retrieve an artifact of high importance to Abstergo, with Deanna assisting Layla remotely from a hotel room. After Layla stumbles upon find Bayek and Aya's mummies and, against Deanna's advice, relives their memories through the Animus, the two become targeted by Abstergo, who dispatch Sigma Team to silence them. Deanna is killed as a result and Layla vows revenge against Abstergo, leading her to later join the Assassins.

Victoria Bibeau 
Dr. Victoria Bibeau (died October 2018) (voiced by Tara Nicodemo) is a former psychiatrist and researcher for Abstergo and former member of the Templar Order who defected to the Assassins. She was introduced in the Last Descendants novel series before making her on-screen debut in Assassin's Creed Odyssey, where she is assigned to Layla Hassan's cell as the team's doctor. She helps Layla locate Atlantis while monitoring her health and expressing concern due to the latter's long sessions in the Animus. After Layla travels to Atlantis, Victoria follows her closely behind and grows worried as she witnesses Layla being slowly corrupted by the Staff of Hermes Trismegistus. Eventually, Victoria attempts to end Layla's sessions in the Animus and take away the Staff for her own good, but the latter, in a fit of rage, accidentally strikes Victoria with the Staff, killing her. This incident sours Layla's relationship with the rest of the cell and takes a big toll on her mental health, as Layla blames herself for her friend's death.

Kiyoshi Takakura 
Kiyoshi Takakura (voiced by Dai Tabuchi) is a Japanese Assassin and former member of the Yakuza featured extensively in Assassin's Creed expanded media. In Assassin's Creed Odyssey, he is a member of Layla Hassan's team, keeping watch on their hideout while the others search for Atlantis. He is never shown on-screen and only communicates with Layla over the radio or via earpiece. After Layla accidentally kills team member Victoria Bibeau, Kiyoshi leaves the team, though he and Layla are later able to part on good terms after being assigned to work together once again on a mission in Tokyo.

Alannah Ryan 
Alannah Ryan (voiced by Elana Dunkelman) is a student and Assassin assigned to Layla Hassan's cell, which specializes in locating historical artifacts. Due to her lack of combat experience, Alannah serves as the team's historian and only assists the others remotely, providing Layla with useful information over the radio or via earpiece. After Layla accidentally kills team member Victoria Bibeau, her relationship with Alannah becomes strained and the latter elects to leave the team.

Historical characters

Characters of Assassin's Creed

Altaïr Ibn-La'Ahad 

Altaïr Ibn-La'Ahad (11 January 1165 – 12 August 1257) (voiced by Philip Shahbaz in Assassin's Creed, and by Cas Anvar in Assassin's Creed: Revelations) is the main protagonist of Assassin's Creed, the spin-off games Assassin's Creed: Altaïr's Chronicles and Assassin's Creed: Bloodlines, and the novel Assassin's Creed: The Secret Crusade, as well as the secondary protagonist of Assassin's Creed: Revelations. He has also made appearances or been mentioned in several other games and spin-off media of the franchise, being a legendary figure in the history of the Assassin Brotherhood. Altaïr is a Syrian-born a member of the Levantine Brotherhood of Assassins who serves as Mentor from 1191 until his death in 1257, assuming the position after killing the previous Mentor, Al Mualim, who betrayed the Assassins. During his tenure as Mentor and its brief interregnum, Altaïr makes several discoveries and inventions that greatly helps the Brotherhood's progression. Under his leadership the Levantine Assassins' spread their influence across the Old World, setting up many guilds in cities like Constantinople. With the Apple of Eden in hand, Altaïr changes the way members of the Brotherhood live their lives, writing the details in his fabled Codex for later generations of Assassins to read. Throughout his travels, Altaïr strengthens the Brotherhood, stops various Templar plots over the years, and stops Genghis Khan's march. In 1257, Altaïr dies sitting quietly in his chair in his secret library in Masyaf, and is found centuries later, in 1512, by Ezio Auditore da Firenze. Altaïr is an ancestor to Desmond Miles through the maternal line.

Al Mualim 

Rashid ad-Din Sinan (1135 – September 1191) (voiced by Peter Renaday), commonly known as Al Mualim (Arabic: "The Teacher") or The Old Man of the Mountain, is based on his real-life counterpart, the Iraqi-born Hashshashin leader in the Syrian town of Masyaf. He is the hidden main antagonist of Assassin's Creed, and also appears in Assassin's Creed: Revelations and Assassin's Creed: The Secret Crusade. Al Mualim serves as Mentor of the Levantine Brotherhood of Assassins from circa 1176 until his death in 1191. A wizened old man, he trains Altaïr as an Assassin from a young age, and raises him in the Brotherhood's castle in Masyaf after his father, Umar, is killed by the Saracens, causing Altaïr to look up to Al Mualim as a second father. At some point in his life, Al Mualim secretly betrays the Brotherhood and helps the Templars find the fabled Apple of Eden, which he seeks for himself, hoping to use its power and knowledge to bring an end to the Crusades and establish worldwide 'peace' by controlling all of humanity. In 1191, he sends Altaïr to retrieve the Apple from the Templars, but his apprentice, blinded by arrogance, breaks all three tenets of the Assassin's Creed and alerts the Templars, though his fellow Assassin, Malik Al-Sayf, manages to grab the Apple before escaping. With the Apple in his possession, Al Mualim orders Altaïr, under the pretext of him going on a journey of redemption, to assassinate all nine Templars who were involved in the search for the artifact, to cover his own involvement. Altaïr succeeds, but in the process learns of Al Mualim's betrayal, and ultimately kills his former mentor in Masyaf. Following Al Mualim's death, Altaïr claims both the Apple and the position of Mentor; a move which initially unnerves many Assassins, but Altaïr would soon prove himself to be an efficient leader, more so than Al Mualim.

Maria Thorpe 
Maria Thorpe (1160 – 12 September 1228) (voiced by Eleanor Noble) is an English noblewoman who becomes a Templar steward, and later the wife of Altaïr. As a child, Maria rejected the gender norms of her time, ultimately being disowned by her parents after annulling her arranged marriage. Seeking to fight in the Third Crusade, she disguises herself as a man and attempts to join the Templar Order. The Templar Grand Master, Robert De Sablé, sees through her ruse, but is impressed by her determination and hires her as his steward. During the events of Assassin's Creed in 1191, Robert deduces that he is Altaïr's final target, so he has Maria serve as a decoy to buy him time. Although she expected Altaïr to kill her, he spares her instead, and warns her not to follow him. After Robert is assassinated, Maria becomes obsessed with revenge. In Assassin's Creed: Bloodlines, she tracks Altaïr to Acre, but he bests her again and takes her prisoner. She escapes in an attempt to join the Templar's new leader, Armand Bouchart, but because of her failure to kill Altaïr, and her "miraculous" escape from him, he perceives her to be either incompetent or a traitor to the Order. He places a bounty on both her and Altaïr, forcing them to work together to kill Bouchart, after which Maria renounces the Templars and joins the Brotherhood. In the following years, she and Altaïr become very fond of each other and eventually marry and have two sons, Darim and Sef. In 1217, Maria joins Altaïr and Darim in a mission to Mongolia to halt the advance of Genghis Khan. While they are away, Abbas murders Sef and seizes leadership of the Assassin. Maria and Altaïr confront Abbas after they return to Masyaf in 1228, but Maria is killed in the ensuing struggle. Altaïr, deeply affected by the loss of his wife, would be haunted by her death for years to come.

Malik Al-Sayf 
Malik Al-Sayf (1165 – 12 September 1228) (voiced by Haaz Sleiman) is a member of the Levantine Assassin Brotherhood in Syria during the High Middle Ages. Trained from an early age in the ways of the Brotherhood, he attains a high rank by 1191. Raised to be an Assassin, Malik learns the fighting arts that strikes fear into the hearts of their enemies. He is an excellent swordsman, a devoted acolyte to the Creed, and a caring adult figure to his brother, Kadar. He is also initially a rival of Altaïr, whom he often berates for disobeying the tenets of the Assassin's Creed. In 1191, Altaïr, Malik, and Kadar go to Solomon's Temple to retrieve the Apple of Eden on the orders of Al Mualim. His jealousy turns into hatred when Altaïr ignores the tenets of the Creed, endangers his companions' lives during the events of Solomon's Temple, and subsequently botches a mission, which results in Kadar's death, and the injury and subsequent amputation of Malik's arm. Malik retrieves the Templar treasure that Altaïr failed to find and delivers it to Al Mualim. No longer able to operate as an Assassin, Malik is made the bureau leader of the Jerusalem Assassins. At first he is bitter towards Altaïr, but over time forgives him and acknowledges his own fault in his brother's death. When Altaïr returns to confront Al Mualim, Malik supports him, distracting the indoctrinated Assassins while Altaïr faces Al Mualim. After Al Mualim's death, Altaïr becomes the new Mentor of the Levantine Assassins and names Malik his second-in-command. Malik is appointed as a temporary leader in Altaïr's absence, though he would soon be imprisoned by Abbas Sofian in Masyaf's dungeons for almost two years with false charges of murder. When Altaïr returns from his quest across the Middle East in 1228, Abbas has Malik executed and sends his severed head to Altaïr as a threat.

Kadar Al-Sayf 
Kadar Al-Sayf (died July 1191) is the younger brother of Malik Al-Sayf and a member of the Levantine Assassin Brotherhood. He is less experienced than his brother and, just like him, is a devoted follower of the Creed, although unlike him admires and deeply respects Altaïr. In 1191, Kadar accompanies Altaïr and Malik to Solomon's Temple to retrieve the Apple of Eden from the Templars. However, Altaïr inadvertently sabotages the mission due to his arrogance, and Kadar, due to his lack of swordsmanship skills, is swiftly killed by the Templars while Altaïr and Malik manage to escape with the Apple.

Richard the Lionheart 

Richard I of England (8 September 1157 – 6 April 1199) (voiced by Marcel Jeannin), commonly known as Richard the Lionheart, reigned as King of England from 1189 until his death in 1199. He is the second monarch of the House of Plantagenet, the commander of the Crusader army during the Third Crusade, and is considered a great military leader and warrior. Upon his death, he is succeeded as King of England by his younger brother, John. In Assassin's Creed, he is encountered by Altaïr during the Battle of Arsuf, where the Assassin informs Richard that his lieutenant, Robert de Sablé, intends to betray him. In response, Robert claims that Altaïr's story is a ruse to keep Richard from interfering in the Assassin's mission. Unsure on whom to believe, Richard leaves the decision in the hands of God, declaring that Robert and his Templars are to fight Altaïr in a trial by combat. Altaïr wins, and Richard accepts the Assassin's version of events.

Robert de Sablé 

Robert de Sablé (voiced by Jean-Philippe Dandenaud) ( 1150 – 7 September 1191) is the secondary antagonist of Assassin's Creed. He is a French lieutenant under Richard the Lionheart, and Grand Master of the Knights Templar during the Third Crusade. Born into a powerful family, Robert is immersed into nobility from birth, though events during his life are difficult to pin down; at some point he becomes lord and ruler of Briollay, France. Subsequently, he joins the Knights Templar and eventually becomes their Grand Master in early 1191. During the Third Crusade, Robert and the Knights Templar lay siege to the city of Acre and conquer it; throughout August 1191, they recapture many fortresses and cities along the Palestinian coast, which have been lost previously. Robert follows a goal similar to the Assassins (to end the war in the Holy Land). Al Mualim has no objections against him ending the Crusade, but is against the way Robert attempts to do so—the Assassins would have people find peace themselves, but the Templars would force their "peace" onto others and attempt to control them. Robert is ultimately assassinated by Altaïr during the Battle of Arsuf in September 1191; which contradicts his historical death in 1193.

Tamir 
Tamir ( 1147 – 1191) (voiced by Ammar Daraiseh) is a black arms merchant from Damascus and a member of the Templar Order, who uses his wealth to fund his fellow Templars' operations with the goal of establishing a new world order. He is the first of the nine Levantine Templars to be assassinated by Altaïr.

Garnier de Naplouse 

Garnier de Naplouse ( 1147 – 1191) (voiced by Hubert Fielden) is a French nobleman and the tenth Grand Master of the Knights Hospitalier in Acre, as well as a member of the Templar Order. He experiments on and tortures innocent people and lunatics he picks up off the streets of Acre, claiming they are his children and that he is helping them. He transformed Acre Fortress into a hospital and is killed by Altaïr inside it.

Talal 
Talal ( 1157 – 1191) (voiced by Jake Eberle) is the leader of a gang of slavers in Jerusalem and a member of the Templar Order. He is Altaïr's third target, and before dying by his blade, he tells the Assassin that he did not sell people for profit, but to "rescue" them by giving them better living conditions.

Abu'l Nuqoud 
Abu'l Nuqoud  ( 1137 – 1191) (voiced by Fred Tatasciore) is Damascus' Saracen merchant king and a member of the Templar Order. He invites many Damascan citizens to a grand party at his palace, where all the attendants are killed with poisoned wine or by the guards so that Abu'l Nuqoud may steal their money intended to fund the Saracen army, as well as exact revenge on those who tormented him because of his appearance. He is Altaïr's fourth target, who kills him after infiltrating his party.

William of Montferrat 

William V, Marquess of Montferrat  (1136–1191) (voiced by Harry Standjofski), also known as Guglielmo V del Monferrato in Italy, is an Italian Crusader and Richard the Lionheart's regent in Acre, as well as a member of the Templar Order. He plans to kill Richard and give Acre to his son Conrad of Montferrat, and makes his plans inside Acre's Citadel, where he is ultimately assassinated by Altaïr.

Majd Addin 
Majd Addin (died 1191) (voiced by Richard Cansino), loosely based on Baha ad-Din ibn Shaddad, is the Saracen regent of Jerusalem and a member of the Templar Order, who rules the city through fear by making examples out of criminals, whom he executes publicly. He is assassinated by Altaïr during one of his executions.

Jubair al Hakim 

Jubair al Hakim (died 1191) (voiced by Fred Tatasciore), loosely based on Ibn Jubayr, is a chief scholar of the Saracens in Damascus and the leader of "The Illuminated", as well as a member of the Templar Order. He plans to have all texts in Damascus burned, claiming that these texts lead people astray. He is killed by Altaïr during one of his public purges.

Sibrand 

Sibrand ( 1157 – 1191) (voiced by Arthur Holden) is a German Crusader and the first Grand Master of the Teutonic Order in Acre, as well as a member of the Templar Order. He intends to have all ships submitted to him be used in a blockade against King Richard, but is killed on his personal ship by Altaïr.

Characters of Assassin's Creed II and Lineage

Ezio Auditore da Firenze 

Ezio Auditore da Firenze (24 June 1459 – 30 November 1524) (voiced by Roger Craig Smith; played by Devon Bostick in Assassin's Creed: Lineage) is the main protagonist of Assassin's Creed II, Assassin's Creed: Brotherhood, and Assassin's Creed: Revelations, as well as the spin-off game Assassin's Creed II: Discovery and the animated short film Assassin's Creed: Embers. He is an Italian nobleman born in Florence during the Renaissance and unknown to most historians and philosophers. He becomes an Assassin in 1476 to avenge the death of his father and brothers in a conspiracy masterminded by the Templars, but slowly learns to overcome his desire for revenge and fight for peace and freedom instead. He is essential in elimating the Templar Order's presence in Italy in the early 16th century, and also foils major Templar schemes in both Spain and the Ottoman Empire during his travels. In 1503, Ezio becomes Mentor of the Italian Brotherhood, a title he holds until 1513. Following his retirement from the Brotherhood, he lives a peaceful life with his family in the Tuscan countryside, ultimately passing away from a heart attack in 1524. Ezio is an ancestor to Desmond Miles through the paternal line.

Federico Auditore 
Federico Auditore (1456 – 29 December 1476) (voiced by Elias Toufexis; played by Jesse Rath in Assassin's Creed: Lineage) is the eldest child of the Auditore family and Ezio's older brother. In 1475 he enters the Medici bank as a clerk, but in 1476 is removed from the bank's payroll (on suspicion of being responsible for the disappearance of a bag of florins on 17 September 1475). At the start of Assassin's Creed II, he helps Ezio fights Vieri de Pazzi, visits a doctor to treat his brother's wound, and races him to the top of Santa Trinita. He is later captured and hanged alongside his father Giovanni and younger brother Petruccio in the Piazza della Signoria on the orders of Uberto Alberti and Rodrigo Borgia.

Giovanni Auditore 
Giovanni Auditore (3 May 1436 – 29 December 1476) (voiced and played by Romano Orzari), loosely based on Giovanni Villani, is the head of the Auditore family, Ezio's father, and a banker, advisor, and nobleman who is a pivotal figure in Florentine banking. Giovanni oversees the Medici bank branches across Italy, and when Lorenzo was busy, he ran the bank. He extends his reach into the bank's international operations, and notices the problems with the Lyon bank, which Francesco Sassetti saves. In 1471 he secures the negotiations between the Pope and the Medici bank. Giovanni is also secretly a member of the Italian Brotherhood of Assassins, and, in 1476, uncovers a plot by Rodrigo Borgia and the Pazzi family to overthrow the Medici. Before he can expose it, however, he and two of his sons, Federico and Petruccio, are arrested and subsequently hanged on the orders of Borgia and Giovanni's former ally, Uberto Alberti. Before his death, Giovanni directs Ezio to find his Assassin equipment, thus setting his son on the path of becoming an Assassin.

Claudia Auditore 
Claudia Auditore (2 January 1461 – unknown) (voiced by Angela Galuppo) is the only daughter of the Auditore family and Ezio's younger sister. Following her father and brothers' execution in 1476, she flees Florence with her mother and Ezio. In 1477, Claudia becomes the financial accountant of the town of Monteriggioni, which is under the leadership of her uncle, Mario Auditore. The town flourishes with Claudia's organization and the money made from Monteriggioni's shops and organizations. In January 1500, Monteriggioni is besieged and largely destroyed by the Papal army commanded by Cesare Borgia, which leave the Auditores homeless. Going against Ezio's desire for them to return to Florence, Claudia and Maria follow Ezio to Rome, where the former eventually becomes the madame of the Rosa in Fiore, the city's most popular brothel. After proving herself to be a worthy fighter to her brother, Ezio inducts Claudia into the Assassin Brotherhood in 1502. The following year, Claudia is captured by Borgia die-hards, and is subsequently saved by Ezio and Niccolò Machiavelli. During this time, she steps down as the madame, and stays in Florence with her friend Paola to recover until 1507. Claudia is given temporary control of the Italian Assassins in 1510 when her brother leaves on a journey to the Middle East to find Altaïr Ibn-LaʼAhad's library. She holds the position until her brother returnes in late 1512, after which Ezio resigns from the Brotherhood and assigns a successor.

Maria Auditore 
Maria Auditore (1432–1504) (voiced by Ellen David; played by Claudia Ferri in Assassin's Creed: Lineage) is a writer and noble. She was born into the Mozzi, a powerful banking family. She is one of the most famous historical sources of the time period due to her multi-volume diary, which has been translated by several notable scholars and is on display in the Uffizi Gallery in Florence. With funding from her parents, she opened up a bakery in the courtyard of her family palazzo, which she transformed into an artistic gathering place. In 1448, she meets Giovanni Auditore, and marries him in 1450. Following the death of her husband and two of her sons, Federico and Petruccio, in 1476, she flees Florence with her surviving son Ezio and daughter Claudia, and moves into the estate of her brother-in-law, Mario Auditore, in Monteriggioni. Years later, following the attack on Monteriggioni in early 1500, she moves to Rome with her family, where she helps Claudia manage the Rosa in Fiore brothel until her death in 1504.

Petruccio Auditore 
Petruccio Auditore (1463 – 29 December 1476) is a student and noble, and the youngest child of the Auditore family. In 1475, he is pulled from school due to illness and confined to a bed. A year later, Petruccio, his father Giovanni, and older brother Federico are arrested and then hanged in the Piazza della Signoria on the orders of Rodrigo Borgia and Uberto Alberti.

Annetta 
Annetta (1457–1511) (voiced by Anne-Marie Baron) is the Auditore family's live-in servant. In 1476, she leaves Florence with Ezio, Claudia, and Maria and moves into the estate of Mario Auditore in Monteriggioni, but later returns to Florence to be with her sister, Paola. She dies under unknown circumstances around 1511.

Cristina Vespucci 
Cristina Vespucci (1459–1498) (voiced by Amber Goldfarb), based on Simonetta Vespucci, is a well-known Florentine beauty, and a favorite of painters; most notably Sandro Botticelli, who uses her as a model for several of his paintings. She is the cousin of the Italian explorer, financier, navigator and cartographer Amerigo Vespucci. Cristina is introduced as Ezio's first love interest in Assassin's Creed II, though most of her story is told during the "Repressed Memory Sequences" from Assassin's Creed: Brotherhood. When Ezio has to leave for Monteriggioni, he asks Cristina to come with him, but she refuses, as she does not want to leave her family behind. Ezio accepts her decision and gives her a pendant to remember him by. In 1478, Cristina marries Manfredo Soderini, more because of her father's will than her own. The day before their wedding, Ezio returns to Florence and visits Cristina, unaware of the direction her life has taken. Cristina tells Ezio she did not expect him to return and reveals her engagement. Even though he is heartbroken, Ezio appeals to Manfredo's conscience, and tells him to stop gambling and be a good husband. Years later, Cristina and her husband travel to Venice for Carnevale. Ezio, who also happens to be in the city, tries to use this opportunity to reconnect with her, only to be rejected, as Cristina tells him that she loved him, but he left her to be married to another man. During the bonfire of the vanities in 1498, Cristina, due to her noble status, is attacked by Girolamo Savonarola's fanatics. Ezio comes to her aid, but she is mortally wounded. Cristina shows him the pendant he gave her twenty-two years ago, and says she wished for another chance with him before dying in his arms.

Mario Auditore 
Mario Auditore (19 March 1434 – 2 January 1500) (voiced by Fred Tatasciore) is Giovanni Auditore's older brother and Ezio's uncle. He is a condottiero and nobleman who stays at Villa Auditore in Monteriggioni and patrols the Tuscan countryside, as well as the Mentor of the Italian Assassins from at least 1476 until his death. In 1440, he starts his military career when he plays an important role in the Battle of Anghiari: on an expedition to Monterchi with his father, he alerts Micheletto Attendolo to the surprise advance of Milanese troops. The attack is foiled and the Florentines win the battle. He then defends Monteriggioni's interests by derailing Florentine attempts to seize Tuscan territory. After Giovanni's death, he brings his children and wife to the Villa and teaches Ezio about the conflict between Assassins and Templars, eventually inducting him into the Assassin Brotherhood in 1488. Mario is later killed by Cesare Borgia during his attack on Monteriggioni in early 1500.

Leonardo da Vinci 

Leonardo di ser Piero da Vinci (1452–1519) (voiced by Carlos Ferro) was an Italian Renaissance polymath and ally of the Assassin Brotherhood. His lifelong friendship with Ezio begins when Maria has Ezio help Leonardo move some paintings from his new workshop. Leonardo comments that his current work lacks purpose, but Maria is confident that he will go on to do great things. After Ezio's father and brothers are executed, Ezio brings two objects from his father's study to Leonardo: a broken hidden blade and Codex page written by Altaïr. Leonardo repairs the blade and deciphers the codex, fascinated by the technological secrets it alludes to. As Ezio continues his Assassin training, Leonardo makes several upgrades to Ezio's weapons and armor, including a poison blade, gun, and poison dart launcher. Some time after Ezio foils the Pazzi conspiracy, Leonardo receives a commission from a Venetian noble, prompting him to set up a new workshop in Venice. As Ezio had his own business in the city, he accompanies him. Leonardo develops an interest in flight, and invents an experimental flying machine, which Ezio uses on one of his missions. After seeing the Apple of Eden, Leonardo marvels at the futuristic visions it shows him. He then develops an interest in Pythagoras's findings, and is able to create a map leading to a temple built by his followers. Leonardo is blackmailed by Cesare into designing Templar war machines, but secretly continues to support Ezio until he is kidnapped by a third party, the Cult of Hermes, who want him to lead them to the Temple of Pythagoras. He is rescued by Ezio and explores the temple, fascinated by the numeric codes found within. Although Leonardo does not appear in Assassin's Creed: Revelations, its novelization describes him dying peacefully at his home in Amboise, with his friends, including Ezio, at his side. In Assassin's Creed III, the Darvenport Homestead's residential carpenter obtains some of Leonardo's blueprints and, at Connor's request, builds a prototype replica of the original flying machine.

Lorenzo de' Medici 

Lorenzo de' Medici (1 January 1449 – 9 April 1492) (voiced and played by Alex Ivanovici) was an Italian statesman and de facto ruler of the Florentine Republic during the Italian Renaissance. Known as "il Magnifico" (the Magnificent) by contemporary Florentines, he was a diplomat, politician and patron of scholars, artists, and poets. His life coincided with the high point of the early Italian Renaissance. His death in 1492 marked the end of the Golden Age of Florence, as the end of his life also meant the end of the fragile peace he had helped maintain between the various Italian states. Lorenzo is buried next to his brother Giuliano in the Medici Chapel in Florence.

In Assassin's Creed II, Lorenzo is an ally of the Assassins, particularly the House of Auditore, working closely with Giovanni against the corrupt Rodrigo Borgia. After Giovanni's death, Lorenzo is saved by Ezio during the Pazzi conspiracy, which starts a long-term partnership between them, with Ezio carrying out several assassination contracts in cities for him.

Caterina Sforza 

Caterina Sforza (1463–1509) (voiced by Cristina Rosato) was the Countess of Forlì and Imola, and the daughter of Galeazzo Maria Sforza, the Duke of Milan. She was engaged to Pope Sixtus IV's nephew, Girolamo Riario, at only 10 years of age, and consummated the marriage at 14. As the countess of Forlì, she becomes a strong ally of the Assassin Brotherhood, meeting Ezio after her husband Girolamo traps her on a small island in Romagna. Eight years later, Caterina has the Orsi brothers kill her husband after finding out that he was working for the Templars and being a poor husband. Caterina offers to keep the Apple of Eden safe in Forlì, but she, Ezio, and Niccolò Machiavelli find the city taken by the Orsi brothers, who were hired by the Templars. Retaking the city, Ezio saves Caterina's children from the Orsi and kills them, though the Apple is taken from him by a mysterious monk. In 1500, Caterina travels to the Italian Assassins' headquarters in Monteriggioni, requesting help against Cesare Borgia's army. Monteriggioni is besieged by Cesare the next day, causing the town to be destroyed and Caterina to be captured. The next year, Caterina is transported to the Castel Sant'Angelo in Rome to be jailed. Ezio infiltrates the Castel and frees Caterina with a key taken from Lucrezia Borgia. A few weeks later, Caterina returns to Florence to await the restoration of her lands. However, her request to Pope Julius II is rejected, and Caterina ultimately dies in Florence from pneumonia in 1509.

Niccolò Machiavelli 

Niccolò di Bernardo dei Machiavelli (3 May 1469 – 21 June 1527) (voiced by Shawn Baichoo), or simply Niccolò Machiavelli, is a supporting character in Assassin's Creed II, Assassin's Creed: Brotherhood, and related media. He is an Italian philosopher, writer, and a member of the Italian Brotherhood of Assassin. Within the Brotherhood, he primarily works with Ezio, and helps him with driving the Orsi brothers from Forlì and removing the friar Girolamo Savonarola from power in Florence to obtain the Apple of Eden from him. Following Mario Auditore's death in early 1500, Machiavelli becomes the de facto leader of the Italian Assassins, and names Ezio his successor in 1503. Together with Ezio and the other Assassin, he fights against the corrupt Borgia family and their Templar allies, ultimately succeeding in removing them from power.

Paola 
Paola (1438 – unknown) (voiced by Claudia Ferri) is the madame of La Rosa Colta, the most popular brothel in Florence, and a member of the Italian Brotherhood of Assassins. In 1446, she was orphaned when her parents were killed at sea, so she began her life of prostitution on the streets until 1454. In 1458 she is arrested for murdering a city guard, and Giovanni Auditore represents her in court, winning the case on a self-defence plea. She is released from prison and starts her own brothel to protect other unfortunate women of the street. Following Giovanni's death in 1476, she guides Ezio in his path to become an Assassin, teaching him how to pickpocket and use crowds of people to hide from city guards. She is later present for Ezio's initiation into the Brotherhood in 1488, and the attack on the Vatican in 1499, creating a distraction alongside other Assassins to allow Ezio to confront Rodrigo Borgia. It is unknown when she died, though in 1512 Ezio's sister Claudia, with whom she had become close friends, mentioned that Paola was still alive and leading the Assassins.

La Volpe 
Gilberto (voiced by Vito DeFilippo), known mainly as La Volpe (English: The Fox), is the leader of the Florentine and Roman Thieves' Guilds, and a member of the Italian Brotherhood of Assassins. Very little is known about his life outside of what is depicted in the games. In 1478, La Volpe assists Ezio in locating an important Templar meeting in Florence, which results in Ezio preventing the Pazzi conspiracy. Ten years later, La Volpe is present for Ezio's induction into the Brotherhood. In 1499, he helps his fellow Assassins attack the Vatican as a distraction to allow Ezio to confront Rodrigo Borgia. After the fall of Monteriggioni in early 1500, La Volpe moves to Rome, where fights the Borgia influence in the city. However, he refuses to work with the Assassins because of his suspicions towards Niccolò Machiavelli. After Ezio helps save some of his thieves and uncovers the identity of the real traitor, La Volpe agrees to assist the Assassins again.

Antonio de Magianis 
Antonio de Magianis (1443 – unknown) (voiced by Carlo Mestroni) is the leader of the Gilda dei Ladri di Venezia (the Venetian Thieves' Guild) and a member of the Italian Brotherhood of Assassins. He was born at the very bottom of Venetian society, son of a cobbler, while his mother was a live-in maid for the Bellini family. He teaches himself to read and write between the apprenticeship sessions with his father, then applies to the University of Padua. He is denied entry due to his low social rank, and is also rejected by other schools in Italy. In 1469 he robs a noble Venetian estate owned by the rector of the University of Padua. He is incarcerated, but mysteriously escapes from prison. Antonio serves as one of Ezio's most prominent allies during his time in Venice, and is later present for his initiation into the Brotherhood in 1488, as well as the attack on the Vatican in 1499, where he creates a distraction alongside other Assassins to allow Ezio to confront Rodrigo Borgia.

Rosa 
Rosa (1460 – unknown) (voiced by Lita Tresierra) is a member of the Venetian Thieves' Gild and an ally of the Assassins. As the daughter of an unknown Venetian nobleman and a prostitute, she grew up on her own on the streets of Venice. In 1475, she meets Antonio de Magianis while attempting to pickpocket him; Antonio catches her, but is impressed by her skills and takes her on as a pupil. She becomes a close friend and love interest of Ezio during his time in Venice, and later replaces Claudia as the madame of the Rosa in Fiore in Rome, after the latter abandons the position in 1504.

Teodora Contanto 
Teodora Contanto (1450 – unknown) (voiced by Nadia Verrucci) is the madame of La Rosa della Virtù, the most popular brothel in Venice, and a member of the Italian Brotherhood of Assassins. Her parents owned a jewellery store, and she was apprenticed to her mother as a shop girl. On 26 November 1467 she engaged in adultery with a married man, and his wife alerted the Venetian courts, so her parents sent her to a nunnery to live the rest of her life in prayer and silence. In 1467 she entered Santa Maria degli Angeli, determined to do penance for her crime, but in 1473 she deserted the Church and abandoned her family name. That same year she opens La Rosa della Virtù, frequented by Pietro Bembo. She mentors Ezio in the Assassin ways during his time in Venice, and is later present for his initiation into the Brotherhood in 1488, as well as the attack on the Vatican in 1499, where she creates a distraction alongside other Assassins to allow Ezio to confront Rodrigo Borgia.

Bartolomeo d'Alviano 

Bartolomeo d'Alviano (1455 – 7 October 1515) (voiced by Alex Ivanovici) is a condottiero, the leader of the Venetian and Roman Mercenaries' Guilds, and a member of the Italian Brotherhood of Assassins. In 1486, he befriends Ezio and works with him to reconquer Venice's Castello District from the Templars. He is later present for Ezio's initiation into the Brotherhood in 1488, and for the attack on the Vatican in 1499, where he creates a distraction alongside other Assassins to allow Ezio to confront Rodrigo Borgia. In 1500, he moves to Rome alongside his second wife, Pantasilea Baglioni, and helps the Assassins fight the Borgia influence in the city, while also fending off French forces led by Cesare Borgia's ally, Octavian de Valois. Bartolomeo is ultimately victorious when Ezio assassinates Valois in 1503. Later in life, Bartolomeo would serve as a general in several Italian armies, until his defeat at the Battle of Agnadello in 1509, where he was captured and held prisoner by the French for four years. After his release, he continued his military career for a few more years, until his death during the siege of Brescia in October 1515.

Duccio de Luca 
Duccio de Luca (1462–1520) (voiced by Shawn Baichoo) is a recurring character in Assassin's Creed II, Brotherhood, and Revelations, whose interactions with Ezio are mostly played for comedic effect. He is a Florentine nobleman who was set to marry Ezio's sister Claudia in 1476; however, due to his womanizing nature, he ends up sleeping with at least six other women. When Claudia finds out about this, she asks Ezio to deal with Duccio, leading him to beat the unfaithful fiancé and warn him to stay away from his sister. Years later, Duccio becomes a trader, but finds little success in making a profit. In 1506, while in Rome on business, he learns that Claudia has become the madame of the Rosa in Fiore brothel, and runs into Ezio again, who is searching for three Leonardo da Vinci paintings Duccio had acquired. After insulting Claudia, enraging Ezio, Duccio summons his henchmen to help him fight the Assassin, but is again defeated and knocked unconscious. In 1511, Duccio somehow ends up in Constantinople, where he attempts to flirt with Sofia Sartor, who shows no interest in him, only to run away terrified at the sight of Ezio, whom he calls the "devil". Duccio would later die penniless in Rome in 1520, from rabies which he most likely received from a stray dog.

Alvise da Vilandino 
Alvise da Vilandino (1441–1500) is a Venetian baggage handler who enlists in the navy. In 1500 he is tasked with defending the fortress of Modon from the Turks. After a heavy night of drinking, he wakes to Turkish cannon fire bombarding the town. Panicking while running across the deck, he trips, hits his head, and drowns. He is accused of negligence by the ship's captain and erased from the logs of the navy.

Rodrigo Borgia 

Rodrigo Borgia (1 January 1431 – 18 August 1503) (voiced and played by Manuel Tadros) is the main antagonist of Assassin's Creed: Lineage and Assassin's Creed II, and a minor antagonist in Assassin's Creed: Brotherhood. Also known as Roderic Llançol and Roderic de Borja i Borja, he was born into a noble Aragonese family, the Borgias, and became a cardinal, and later Pope Alexander VI in 1492. In the games, he is also secretly the Grand Master of the Italian Rite of the Templar Order during the Renaissance, and forms alliances with influential families such as the Pazzi and the Barbarigos as part of his plot to secure control of Italy in the name of the Templars. He manipulates events behind the scenes, and seeks to unlock "the Vault" underneath the Vatican Palace, believing it contains the power to enslave humanity. He is ultimately defeated by Ezio in 1499, but the latter spares his life, despite Rodrigo being responsible for the death of his father and brothers. Following his defeat, Rodrigo, no longer seeking power, decides to focus on his papacy, leaving his son Cesare to lead the Templars and the Papal army. Using Rodrigo's resources, Cesare wages war on other Italian states and the Assassins, while ignoring his father's warnings, who comes to fear Cesare's lust for power. In 1503, he tries to poison him, but Cesare is warned of this by his sister Lucrezia, and kills Rodrigo in the ensuing struggle.

Uberto Alberti 
Uberto Alberti (1416 – 31 December 1476) (voiced and played by Michel Perron) is a self taught lawyer, Florence's Gonfaloniere of Justice, and a friend and ally of Lorenzo de' Medici and the Auditore family. However, at some point before 1476, he is secretly turned to the Templar cause, and agrees to eliminate the Auditores to facilitate the Templars' plot to take over Florence. He orders the arrest of all Auditore men, and although Giovanni, Federico, and Petruccio Auditore are captured, Ezio manages to escape. After the arrest, Ezio is sent by his father to find documents to give to Uberto to prove their innocence, but he betrays them and has them hanged the following day on the charge of treason. Shortly after, Uberto is assassinated by Ezio at in the courtyard of the Santa Croce church. His death is considered one of the most satisfying deaths in video games.

Vieri de' Pazzi 
Vieri de' Pazzi (1459 – 14 April 1478) (voiced by Yuri Lowenthal) is a Florentine nobleman and the youngest member of the Pazzi family, as well as a member of the Templar Order. He spends his father's money frivolously on weaponry, exotic animals and clothes. Fiercely competitive, he hosts running races, boating and horseback riding, but all of them are rigged; when he loses, he invites the winner's entire family for a victory poisoned dinner. He is secretly trained by his father, Francesco, in the Templar ways and assists in the plot to take over Florence. Vieri develops a rivalry with Ezio, who ultimately kills him during a confrontation in San Gimignano in 1478.

Francesco de' Pazzi 

Francesco de' Pazzi (28 January 1444 – 26 April 1478) (voiced by Andreas Apergis) is a Florentine banker, a member of the Pazzi noble family, and Vieri de Pazzi's father. He is also a member of the Templar Order and one of the instigators the Pazzi conspiracy, a plot to remove the Medici from power in Florence. In 1478, Francesco and other conspirators attempt to assassinate Lorenzo and Giuliano de' Medici, and while they succeed in killing the latter, Lorenzo is saved by Ezio's interference. Shortly after, Ezio tracks down and kills Francesco, before his naked body is hanged from the Palazzo della Signoria to serve as a warning to the Templars. Historically, Francesco was hanged from the window of the Sala dei Duecento by an angry Florentine mob after the failure of the conspiracy.

Jacopo de' Pazzi 

Jacopo de' Pazzi (1421 – 3 January 1480) (voiced by Arthur Grosser) is the head of the Pazzi family, Francesco de' Pazzi's uncle, and a member of the Templar Order. As one of the conspirators involved in the Pazzi plot, he is tasked with calming the Florentine citizens after the assassination of the Medici. However, the conspiracy fails due to Ezio's interference, and Jacopo is later stabbed by Rodrigo Borgia, the Templar Grand Master, for his failure, before being put out of his misery by Ezio. Historically, Jacopo did not die two years after the failed Pazzi conspiracy, but was executed alongside other members of his family in 1478 by an angry Florentine mob.

Bernardo di Bandino Baroncelli 

Bernardo di Bandino Baroncelli (1453 – 3 May 1479) (voiced by Tod Fennell) is a banker employed by the Pazzi, a member of the Templar Order, and one of the instigators of the Pazzi conspiracy; wishing to see the Medici displaced from Florence due to their exlie of his cousins. He is tracked down and killed by Ezio in San Gimignano after the failure of the Pazzi plot. Historically, Baroncelli fled to Constantinople, but was later arrested and brought back to Florence, where he was hanged on 29 December 1479.

Stefano da Bagnone 
Stefano da Bagnone (1418–1479) (voiced by Tony Robinow) is a monk and the secretary of Jacopo de' Pazzi who trained in Rome as a torturer. He is also a member of the Templar Order, and one of the instigators of the Pazzi conspiracy. After the failure of the plot, he is tracked down and killed by Ezio at a monastery near San Gimignano. Historically, Bagnone was a priest who, following the failed assassination attempt on Lorenzo de' Medici, fled Florence and found refuge among monks, but was soon arrested, tortured, and finally hanged on 3 May 1478.

Antonio Maffei da Volterra 

Father Antonio Maffei da Volterra (1450–1478) (voiced and played by Shawn Baichoo) is a Florentine priest employed by Lorenzo de' Medici. After witnessing the sacking of his hometown of Volterra by mercenaries, he blames it on Lorenzo and joins the Templar Order to exact revenge on him; becoming one of the instigators of the Pazzi conspiracy. He is tracked down and killed by Ezio in San Gimignano after the failure of the plot. Historically, Maffei found refuge in Badia Fiorentina following the failed assassination attempt on Lorenzo, but was quickly found and arrested, and subsequently hanged on 3 May 1478.

Francesco Salviati 

Francesco Salviati Riario (1443 – 12 April 1479) was the Archbishop of Pisa from 1474 until his death, and one of the Pazzi conspirators; wishing to see the Medici removed from power for opposing his appointment as Archbishop of Florence. He joins the Templar Order to this end, but is ultimately killed by Ezio at his villa in the Tuscan countryside after the failure of the Pazzi plot. While in the game Salviati's role was simply to lead Pazzi-allied troops into Florence, historically he was one of the main instigators of the conspiracy, as he was supposed to kill Gonfaloniere Petrucci and take control of the Palazzo della Signoria. However, he was quickly arrested by Petrucci and then hanged from the window of the Sala dei Duecento by a Florentine mob, next to Francesco de' Pazzi.

Emilio Barbarigo 
Emilio Barbarigo (1421 – 11 September 1485) (voiced by Arthur Holden) is a wealthy and influential Venetian merchant, and a member of the Barbarigo noble family and of the Templar Order. By funding the Venetian police force, he effectively controls the streets of Venice, using the guards to eliminate criminals, as well as any competition. He lives in a heavily guarded palace in the city's San Polo district, which he rules with an iron fist, terrorizing both merchants and thieves. Emilio also plays a role in the Pazzi conspiracy, supplying weapons to all those involved. With the help of the Venetian Thieves' Guild, Ezio infiltrates Emilio's palace and assassinates him in 1485, freeing San Polo of his tyrannical rule.

Carlo Grimaldi 
Carlo Grimaldi (1445 – 14 September 1485) (voiced by Guy Chapellier) is a member of the Council of Ten, Venice's governing body, as well as of the Templar Order. Hailing from the House of Grimaldi, Carlo sought political power from a young age, which he achieved thanks to his friendship with the Doge of Venice, Giovanni Mocenigo. After proving his loyalty by exposing the relationship between the daughter of a Venetian politician and the son of a servant, Carlo was rewarded with a seat on the Council of Ten, and used his newfound position to aid the Templar cause. In 1485, Carlo tries to persuade the Doge to join the Templar Order, but fails, and so he is tasked with poisoning him so that a Templar may take his place. Ezio tries to prevent the assassination, but arrives moments too late. Carlo then frames the Assassin for the Doge's murder, but before he can escape, he is killed by Ezio in the courtyard of the Doge's Palace.

Marco Barbarigo 

Marco Barbarigo ( 1413 – 15 February 1486) (voiced by Tony Robinow; played by Frank Fontaine in Assassin's Creed: Lineage) was the Doge of Venice from 1485 until his death. In the game, he is portrayed as a member of the Templar Order, and becomes Doge after his predecessor, Giovanni Mocenigo, is poisoned by a fellow Templar, Carlo Grimaldi. Marco's tenure as Doge is short-lived because he is assassinated by Ezio during the Carnevale of 1486. After his death, his brother Agostino, a supporter of the Assassins, is instated as Doge.

Silvio Barbarigo 
Silvio Barbarigo (1435 – 11 July 1486) (voiced and played by Harry Standjofsky), also known as Il Rosso (English: The Red One), is a member of the influential Barbarigo family and of the Templar Order. Following his father's assassination by his uncle, Silvio began working for the latter, eventually becoming his advisor after uncovering a plot by the Saranzo family against the Barbarigos. Years later, Silvio carried out his revenge against his uncle, and had him killed to take over his palace. By 1485, Silvio has become a prominent figure in Venice like his relatives Emilio and Marco Barbarigo, serving on the Supreme Tribunal as state inquisitor, and is in control of the city's Castello District. In 1486, while planning an expedition to Cyprus to retrieve an Apple of Eden, Silvio and his fellow Templar, Dante Moro, are killed by Ezio with the help of Bartolomeo d'Alviano.

Dante Moro 
Dante Moro (1460 – 11 July 1486) was the captain of the Venetian city guard and heir to one of the most prestigious and affluent families in Venice. However, his life took a turn for the worse when his friend, Marco Barbarigo, decided he wanted Dante's wife for himself and hired assassins to kill him. Dante survived the attempt on his life, but was stabbed in the cranium, leaving him with permanent brain damage. Now having the mind of a child, Dante was easily persuaded to become Marco's bodyguard and divorce his wife, who was then forced to marry Marco, though she never lost hope Dante would one day recover. By 1485, Dante has begun serving other members of the Templar Order as well, essentially acting as their 'dumb muscle'. In 1486, he is killed by Ezio alongside his fellow Templar, Silvio Barbarigo.

Orsi Brothers 
Checco (1458 – 7 July 1488) (voiced by Andreas Apergis) and Ludovico Orsi (1455 – 7 July 1488) are two mercenary brothers and members of the Templar Order. Hailing from a noble family, they start a successful money lending business, and kill anyone who does not pay them back on time. In 1488, they are hired by Caterina Sforza to murder her husband Girolamo Riario after discovering he was a Templar and involved in the Pazzi conspiracy. The brothers agree to carry out the assassination because Girolamo owed them money. Not long after, Rodrigo Borgia hires the Orsi brothers to obtain a map to the pages of Altaïr's Codex made by Girolamo. To this end, they lead an army of mercenaries in a siege on Forlì, and kidnap Caterina's children. Ezio helps to defend the city and rescues the children, killing Ludovico in the process, but Checco manages to steal the Apple of Eden, which Ezio had left with Caterina. However, Checco would soon meet the same fate as his brother, being killed by Ezio just outside of Forlì, before he could deliver the Apple to Borgia.

Girolamo Savonarola 

Girolamo Savonarola (21 September 1452 – 23 May 1498) (voiced by Alex Ivanovici) was a Dominican friar and the leader of Florence from 1494 to 1498. In 1488, Savonarola manages to steal an Apple of Eden from Ezio, who subsequently spends years searching for him to recover the artifact. Recognizing the Apple's powers, he uses it to instigate the Bonfire of the Vanities in Florence; hoping to cleanse the city of everything he regards as evil, such as art and wealth. He is ultimately removed from power by the Assassins in 1498, and then sentenced to death by the people of Florence. Although he is set to be burnt at the stake, Ezio ends Savonarola's life painlessly by stabbing him with his hidden blade.

Characters of Assassin's Creed II: Discovery

Luis de Santángel 

Luis de Santángel (died 1498) (voiced by Adam Harrington) is the finance minister of King Ferdinand II of Aragon and Queen Isabella I of Castile, and a member of the Spanish Brotherhood of Assassins. He persuades the Queen to finance Christopher Columbus's voyage across the Atlantic Ocean, although he ends up paying for most of the expenses with his own money. Within the Brotherhood, he helps Ezio uncover and foil a Templar conspiracy to exploit the Granada War as a means to bankrupt the Castilian treasury and prevent Columbus's voyage. Later in life, Luis turns on Queen Isabella after she becomes corrupted by the Templars and makes plans to poison her, though he would die before he could see his plan come to fruition.

Raphael Sánchez 
Raphael Sánchez (died 1505) (voiced by Chuck Kourouklis) is the treasurer of Queen Isabella I and a member of the Spanish Brotherhood of Assassins. He is based on Gabriel Sanchez, who was historically the royal treasurer of King Ferdinand II of Aragon. He fights against the Templars during the Spanish Inquisition, and helps Ezio rescue Assassins who have been arrested on the orders of Tomás de Torquemada in Aragon. Towards the end of the Granada War, Raphael works with Ezio and Luis de Santángel to thwart a Templar conspiracy to prevent Christopher Columbus's voyage across the Atlantic Ocean.

Christopher Columbus 

Christoffa Corombo (1451 – 20 May 1506) (voiced by Roger L. Jackson), better known by his anglicized name Christopher Columbus, was an Italian navigator and explorer who famously sailed across the Atlantic Ocean, allowing Europe to discover and begin colonoizing the New World; his first voyage, sponsored by the Catholic Monarchs of Spain, was in 1492. In the game, the Templars seek to prevent this voyage by any means, because they wish to be the first to conquer the New World, leading the Assassins, mainly Ezio, to defend Columbus on several occasions. Despite this, Columbus does not appear to be aware of the existence of either of the two orders.

Columbus also makes a minor appearance in the Assassin's Creed film, where he is entrusted by Aguilar de Nerha with an Apple of Eden, which he takes to his grave.

Isabella I of Castile 

Queen Isabella I of Castile (22 April 1451 – 26 November 1504) (voiced by Nicole Vigil) was Queen of Castile from 1474 and, through her marriage to King Ferdinand II of Aragon, also Queen of Aragon. The two jointly ruled over a dynastically unified Spain in the late 15th-century, and are known together as the Catholic Monarchs of Spain. Isabella and Ferdinand are remembered for establishing the Spanish Inquisition in 1478 and funding Christopher Columbus's voyages across the Atlantic Ocean, which made Spain the first European power to discover and colonize the New World. During their reign, Spain also fought in the Granada War from 1482 to 1492, which resulted in Granada's defeat and annexation to Castile, effectively ending all Islamic rule on the Iberian peninsula. In the game, Isabella is depicted as an ally of the Assassins, though over time, she would be converted to the Templar cause, after they infiltrated her close circle and forced her to pledge loyalty to the Borgias. As a result, Isabella would die poisoned by the Assassins in 1504.

Queen Isabella also makes a minor appearance in the Assassin's Creed film, played by Marysia S. Peres.

Helene Dufranc 
Helene Dufranc is a French adventurer whom Ezio encounters during his time in Spain. She was born into a family of Assassins just like him, but chose to put her talents to use as a mercenary rather than blindly follow the Creed. Helene and Ezio first meet in Barcelona when she briefly steals his sword, and the two develop a rivalry. After a few more encounters, however, and Helene helping Ezio foil an assassination attempt on Queen Isabella, the two ultimately part ways as allies. Helene is a character created exclusively for the iOS version of the game.

Gaspar Martínez 
Gaspar Martínez (died 1491) (voiced by Doug Boyd) is a prosecutor for the Spanish Inquisition's tribunal in Barcelona. He is responsible for the arrests of the Assassins in the city, though he is unaware of their true nature, believing them to be simple heretics. He is assassinated by Ezio in his personal quarters in 1491.

Pedro Liorente 
Pedro Liorente (died 1491) (voiced by Roger L. Jackson) is a calificador of the Spanish Inquisition serving under Tomás de Torquemada. He is killed by Ezio in Zaragoza in 1491.

Juan de Marillo 
Juan de Marillo (died 1492) (voiced by Erik Braa) is an inquisitor serving under Tomás de Torquemada. Given the task of purging Granada of heretics following its conquest by Spain, he would not get the chance to carry it out due to his death at Ezio's hands in 1492.

Characters of Assassin's Creed: Brotherhood

Angelina Ceresa 
Angelina Ceresa (died 2 January 1500) is an acquaintance of Claudia Auditore, who lived in Monteriggioni. On 1 January 1500 she and Ezio help prepare Claudia's birthday party in the Villa Auditore. The following day, Angelina is killed when Cesare Borgia's forces besiege Monteriggioni, and her head is stuck upon the pike of a Borgia soldier's halberd.

Margherita dei Campi 
Margherita dei Campi is a countess of Rome. She tends to Ezio's injuries, sustained during the attack on Monteriggioni, after Niccolò Machiavelli takes him to Margherita's house in Rome's northern Campagna District.

Fabio Orsini 

Fabio Orsini (1476 – 29 December 1504) (voiced by Gianpaolo Venuta) is an Italian condottiero and a member of the Papal Guard. Hailing from the Orsini noble family, he is also the cousin of Bartolomeo d'Alviano and an ally of the Assassin Brotherhood. In 1494, he enters Montepulciano to help the Sienese. In 1498, he partners with Bartolomeo against the Savelli family, and seems to help his new in-laws when he marries Jeronima Borgia, Lucrezia Borgia's cousin. However, in 1499, while Cesare is in Romagna, he frees a friend imprisoned in the Tor di Nona, leading to Cesare killing Fabio's father Paolo as punishment. Starting with 1500, he supports the Assassins in crippling the Borgias' hold on Rome by providing them with a hideout and leading his forces against the army of Micheletto Corella, Cesare's bodyguard and assassin. However, he loses and becomes and outlaw raiding the countryside and put on a list of bandits published by the Pope. After Rodrigo Borgia's death at Cesare's hands in 1503, Fabio regains his noble title and enters the service of Pope Julius II, arresting Cesare on his orders. In December 1504, Fabio would die from a head injury sustained during the Battle of Garigliano.

Pantasilea Baglioni 
Pantasilea Baglioni (1476 – 1537) (voiced by Millie Tresierra) is an Italian noblewoman, hailing from the Baglioni family, the rulers of Perugia, and the second wife of Bartolomeo d'Alviano. After moving to Rome with her husband, she helps him and the Assassins combat their enemies with her tactician skills. She also helps manage the Assassins' pigeon coops in the city, through which they receive information about their targets.

Egidio Troche 
Egidio Troche (1436 – unknown) is a Roman Senator. His younger brother Francesco is a close confidant of Cesare Borgia, whom he personally dislikes. Egidio is rescued by Ezio from his debt to "The Banker", Juan Borgia, in return for providing the Assassins with several potential targets within Rome.

Cesare Borgia 

Cesare Borgia (13 September 1475 – 12 March 1507) (voiced by Andreas Apergis) is the main antagonist of Assassin's Creed: Brotherhood. Historically, he was an Italian condottiero, nobleman, and the illegitimate son of Rodrigo Borgia, also known as Pope Alexander VI. In the game, he is portrayed as also being a high-ranking a member of the Italian rite of the Templar Order, becoming its de facto leader after Rodrigo stepped down in January 1500. After leading the Papal Army to many victories in the Italian Wars as Captain General, Cesare becomes sadistic and develops a lust for conquest, planning to unify all of Italy and conquer Spain. Seeing the Assassins as a potential threat to his plans and seeking the powerful Apple of Eden in their possession, he besieges their base in Monteriggioni in early 1500, but this only provokes them into targeting Cesare and his allies, much to Rodrigo's chagrin, who had just abandoned his feud with the Assassins. While Cesare is occupied with his conquests, Ezio and the other Assassins cripple his control over Rome and kill his lieutenants, weakening the Templar Order. When Rodrigo refuses to give Cesare any more money, fearing his lust for power, Cesare furiously confronts him but learns that his father has secretly poisoned him, and kills him in the ensuing struggle. Cesare survives the effects of the poison he was given, but loses the Apple to the Assassins, and is eventually arrested on the orders of Pope Julius II in 1503. After breaking out of prison in 1506, Cesare gains the support of his brother-in-law, John III of Navarre, and is given command of the Navaresse army. During the Siege of Viana in March 1507, Cesare is tracked down by Ezio, who fights him on the battlements of a crumbling castle. Cesare is ultimately defeated and thrown off the battlements to his death.

Lucrezia Borgia 

Lucrezia Borgia (18 April 1480 – 24 June 1519) (voiced by Liane Balaban) is an Italian noblewoman, the illegitimate daughter of Rodrigo Borgia and the younger sister of Cesare Borgia. Like her father and brother, she is also a member of the Templar Order. Lucrezia is first seen in a portrait in Assassin's Creed II as a little girl with brown hair, before appearing in Assassin's Creed: Brotherhood as a grown woman, her hair now blonde. Lucrezia is shown to have an incestuous affair with her brother, who repeatedly promises her that she will be his queen. She secures political advantages for her family by marrying powerful nobles and then having them disgraced or killed soon thereafter. Eventually, she grows tired of Cesare's womanizing ways and plans to leave the Vatican, but she still warns him of Rodrigo's attempt to poison him. In turn, Cesare beats Lucrezia until she reveals where Rodrigo hid the Apple of Eden seized from the Assassins. Disillusioned by his actions, she tells Ezio where to find the Apple before leaving the Vatican. Her in-game portrait reveals that she and her husband flee Rome and relocate to Ferrara, where she encounters Ezio again in 1506 while the latter is looking for one of Leonardo da Vinci's paintings in her possession. Lucrezia would spend the next years of her life looking after her children and praying to repent for her sins, until her death in 1519.

Juan Borgia The Elder 

Juan Borgia The Elder (1446 – 1 August 1503) (voiced by Harry Standjofski), also known as "The Banker", is a Templar and a member of the Borgia family, the nephew of Rodrigo Borgia. He was the first of ten cardinal-nephews to be elevated by Rodrigo after the latter became Pope in 1492. As one of Cesare's three generals assigned to keep Rome under the Borgias' rule, Juan is the one who handles Cesare's military funds, providing him with the means to continue his conquests in Italy. He is killed by Ezio during a public orgy he is hosting, thus cutting off Cesare's funds.

Octavian de Valois 
Octavian de Valois (1448 – August 1503) (voiced by Arthur Holden) is a French general, the Baron of Valois, and a member of the Templar Order. A distant cousin of King Louis XII, he was sent in 1498 to front the ranks of the Italian campaign despite his lack of military experience. Within the Templar Order, he is one of Cesare Borgia's top generals, and provides military aid, allowing the Borgias to maintain their grip on Rome. In 1503, his men begin attacking the forces of Bartolomeo d'Alviano on the outskirts of the city, and manage to capture his wife Pantasilea Baglioni, whom Octavian intends to use as leverage to force Bartolomeo to surrender. However, Ezio, Bartolomeo, and his men manage to infiltrate Octavian's barracks after stealing some French uniforms, where Ezio assassinates Octavian and rescues Pantasilea.

Micheletto Corella 

Micheletto Corella ( 1470 – 1506) (voiced by Tony Calabretta) is a Valencian condottiero, executioner, and a member of the Templar Order, as well as Cesare's personal bodyguard and assassin. In 1503, Ezio nearly assassinates him at the Colosseum in Rome during a play to rescue Pietro Rossi (Lucrezia's lover) and to gain information on Cesare's plans on attacking Romagna, but chooses to spare his life. Following Cesare's arrest, Micheletto helps him escape from prison in 1506, only to later be killed by him.

Followers of Romulus 
The Followers of Romulus (Latin: Secta Luporum) are a pagan cult operating in several abandoned locations underneath Rome. They worship Romulus and believe he was part wolf and part man. The leaders of the cult are hired by the Borgia to influence the Followers into doing their bidding, which often end in "sermons" and evocations of their god. They are mainly used to cause fear amongst civilians before being instructed to focus on the Assassins. From 1500 to 1503, Ezio is able to locate all of the Followers' lairs and eliminate most of theirs members. In the process, he retrieves the six Scrolls of Romulus they were guarding, which hold the keys to the vault where the fabled treasure of Romulus is kept.

Iacopo de Grassi 
Iacopo de Grassi (died 1500) is a high-ranking Borgia guard in Rome and the captain of one of the five Borgia towers that rule over the Centro District. In January 1500 he is killed by Ezio, who throws him into a scaffolding.

Il Carnefice 
Il Carnefice (English: The Executioner) (1473 – January 1500) is an executioner allied to the Borgia who considers himself a twisted artist. He is assassinated by Ezio shortly after his arrival in Rome. His character model is also used for one of the playable characters in the game's multiplayer, "the Executioner".

Malfatto 
Malfatto (died 1502) is a masked doctor allied to the Borgia who preys on people living in Rome's poor districts, primarily courtesans. In 1502, he is assassinated by Ezio while lurking outside the Rosa in Fiore. His character model is also used in the game's multiplayer, under the title of "the Doctor".

Silvestro Sabbatini 
Silvestro Sabbatine (1472–1502) is a slave trader loyal to the Borgia who claims to be a nobleman. After failing Cesare in the past, he had his left arm cut off by Micheletto Corella, forcing him to sport a prosthesic claw. He is killed by Ezio in 1502. Silvestro's character model is also used in the game's multiplayer, under the title of "the Nobleman".

Lanz 
Lanz (1480 – August 1503) is a Roman thief and leader of the Cento Occhi street gang connected to a variety of domestic disturbances. After being caught robbing a Borgia carriage once, he was recruited into the Templars due to his skills, becoming a close ally of Cesare Borgia. He is assassinated by Ezio in 1503. Lanz's character model is also used in the game's multiplayer, under the title of "the Thief".

Gaspar de la Croix 
Gaspar de la Croix (1466 – August 1503) is a weapons engineer and expert marksman hired by Cesare Borgia to create weapons for his army, as well as assassinate various targets for him. He is killed by Ezio in 1503. His character model is also used in the game's multiplayer, under the title of "the Engineer".

Donato Mancini

Donato Mancini (1473 – August 1503) is a captain of the Papal Army under the direct employ of Cesare Borgia who is skilled at riding horses. After winning a horse race against Cesare once, he was savagely beaten by his mercenaries in retaliation, though he remained loyal to the Borgia. He is killed by Ezio in 1503. His character model is also used in the game's multiplayer, under the title of "the Captain".

Auguste Oberlin 
Auguste Oberlin (1468 – August 1503) is Cesare Borgia's personal blacksmith who creates weapons for his troops and spreads Borgia propaganda throughout Rome. In 1503, after beating his wife during an argument, she helps Ezio lure him out by tearing down his propaganda, allowing the Assassins to kill him. Auguste's character model is also used in the game's multiplayer, under the title of "the Blacksmith".

Ristoro 
Ristoro (1465 – August 1503) is a violent and perverted priest allied with the Borgia. He is assassinated by Ezio in 1503. His character model is also used in the game's multiplayer, under the title of "the Priest".

Lia de Russo 
Lia de Russo (1476 – August 1503) is a smuggler of rare artifacts and a Templar serving under Cesare Borgia. She is killed by Ezio in 1503. Her character model is also used in the game's multiplayer, under the title of "the Smuggler".

Nicolaus Copernicus 

Nicolaus Copernicus (19 February 1473 – 24 May 1543), also known as Niccolò Copernico, was a Renaissance polymath best known for formulating a model of the universe that placed the Sun rather than Earth at its center; he was the first astronomer to do so correctly. In the Copernicus Conspiracy DLC for Assassin's Creed: Brotherhood, Ezio must protect Copernicus from the Templars, who are trying to kill him to prevent him from educating the public with his revolutionary theories.

Salaì 

Gian Giacomo Caprotti da Oreno ( 1480 – 19 January 1524) (voiced by David Kaye), commonly known as Salaì, was an Italian artist and pupil of Leonardo da Vinci from 1490 to 1518. He is Leonardo's most famous apprentice, and has also been speculated to have been his lover. In 1506, he helps Ezio investigate Leonardo's disappearance after the latter is kidnapped by the Cult of Hermes.

Ercole Massimo 
Ercole Massimo (1474 – 22 June 1506) is an Italian nobleman and a member of the Massimo family, one of Rome's wealthiest and oldest families. He is also the leader of the covert Cult of Hermes, who follow the teachings of the Isu Hermes Trismegistus and are dedicated to "transforming mankind". In 1506, he and his fellow Hermeticists kidnap Leonardo da Vinci and take him to the catacombs underneath Rome in search for the hidden entrance to the Temple of Pythagoras. When Ezio eventually tracks them down after finding a map leading to the temple hidden on Leonardo's paintings, Ercole tries to convince him to join them, but Ezio refuses and kills Ercole and his men in the ensuing fight.

Characters of Assassin's Creed: Revelations and Embers

Yusuf Tazim 
Yusuf Tazim ( 1467 – April 1512) (voiced by Chris Parson) is an easygoing Assassin and the leader of the Ottoman Brotherhood of Assassins in the early 16th-century, succeeding the previous Mentor, Ishak Pasha. When Ezio arrives in Constantinople in 1511, Yusuf quickly befriends him and introduces him to the city and the local Assassins' struggle against the Templars. He also provides Ezio with most of the new tools introduced in the game, such as the hookblade and bombs. With Ezio's help, Yusuf establishes good relations with the Ottoman monarchy by befriending Suleiman I and thwarting the Templars' attempts to rebuild the Byzantine Empire. When Ezio has to leave for Cappadocia, he entrusts Yusuf to look after Sofia Sartor in his absence. Sofia's shop is later raided by the Templars, and although Yusuf and the other Assassins try fighting them off, they are ultimately overwhelmed and killed. Ezio discovers Yusuf's body upon his return to Constantinople, and uses his death to rally the remaining Assassins to fight the Templars.

Yusuf also appears in a deleted scene of the 2016 Assassin's Creed film, played by Matias Varela (who also plays his descendant, Emir).

Sofia Sartor 
Sofia Sartor (1476 – unknown) (voiced by Anna Tuveri) is a Venetian-Ottoman bookshop owner and literary enthusiast. Although she was born in Constantinople, she was forced to leave for Venice when the Ottoman-Venetian war began in 1499. Sofia returned to her birthplace in 1507 to run a bookstore at the old Polo trading post. In 1511, she meets Ezio and the two grow close as they work together to find the keys to Altaïr Ibn-LaʼAhad's Masyaf library, which were hidden in Constantinople by the Polos. Although Ezio initially tries to conceal the true purpose of these keys, not wanting to get Sofia involved in the Assassin-Templar conflict, he is later forced to rescue her after she is kidnapped by the Templars in an attempt to get Ezio to give away the keys. After leaving Constantinople together, Ezio tells Sofia about the true nature of his "work" on their way to Masyaf to unlock the library. Later in life, the couple get married, settle down in a villa in Tuscany, and have two children: Flavia and Marcello. In 1524, Sofia is with Ezio and Flavia in Florence to buy groceries when the elderly Ezio passes away from a heart attack.

Suleiman 

Suleiman I (6 November 1494 – 6 September 1566) (voiced by Haaz Sleiman), also known as Suleiman the Magnificent and Suleiman the Lawgiver, was the tenth Sultan of the Ottoman Empire from 1520 until his death, widely regarded as one of the greatest Sultans in history due to his progressive attitude and the prosperity of the Empire during his reign. In the game, the seventeen year old Suleiman befriends Ezio shortly after the latter's arrival in Constantinople, and initially avoids telling him of his true identity by posing as a simple student. However, after Ezio saves Suleiman from a kidnapping attempt by the Templars, the latter enlists his help in investigating the feud between his father, Selim I, and uncle, Ahmet, over the claim to the Ottoman throne. This leads Ezio to uncover a Templar plot, headed by Ahmet (whom Suleiman had always supported over Selim), to restore the Byzantine Empire and use Isu artifacts to establish what the Templars view as "peace" by eradicating all differences between men. After discovering his uncle's betrayal, Suleiman, although shocked and not agreeing with the Templars' views, asks Ezio to spare Ahmet's life if he can. Suleiman also speaks with his father and, while unsuccessful in persuading him not to kill Ahmet, manages to convince him to spare Ezio and exile him from Constantinople instead. After succeeding Selim as Sultan years later, Suleiman would prove to be an important ally to the Assassins in their battle against the Templars.

Piri Reis 

Piri Reis ( 1467 – 1553) (voiced by Alex Ivanovici), born Ahmed Muhiddin Piri, was a famed admiral and cartographer who served in the Ottoman Navy. In the game, he is portrayed as a member of the Assassin Brotherhood, having joined sometime in 1506. Within the Brotherhood, he primarily serves as a technician and intelligence gatherer, providing the Assassins with materials and methods for crafting bombs from his small studio in the Grand Bazaar. He is also a trusted friend of Yusuf Tazim, and later befriends Ezio.

Tarik Barleti 
Tarik Barleti (1470 – 1511) (voiced by JB Blanc) is the captain of the Janissaries, the personal guard of the Ottoman Empire. Prince Suleiman believes Tarik to be a Templar because of his behavior and his sale of weapons to Manuel Palaiologos, a known Templar, despite Tarik's friendship with Suleiman's father, Selim I, in the past. Suleiman decides to act on his theory and asks Ezio to kill Tarik. In his final moments, Tarik reveals that he feigned his betrayal to get close to the Templars and discover their hideout in Cappadocia, which he planned to attack. He makes a final request to Ezio to stop the Templars, which the latter honors. Tarik is one of the few assassination targets in the series that is unaffiliated with the Templars or Assassins.

Dilara 
Dilara (voiced by Nadia Verrucci) is an Ottoman spy sent by Tarik Barleti to infiltrate the Byzantine Templars' hideout in Cappadocia, to observe their movements and make preparations for when Tarik and his men would attack them. However, the attack does not occur, due to Ezio killing Tarik, and the spies accompanying Dilara are eventually discovered and captured. When Ezio arrives in Cappadocia in 1512, he attempts to make amends for his assassination of Tarik by carrying out his original plan, and meets with Dilara. The two then work together to rescue the captured spies and eliminate the Templar presence in Cappadocia.

Ishak Pasha 

Ishak Pasha was an Ottoman general, statesman, and Grand Vizier, as well as the Mentor of the Ottoman Brotherhood of Assassins until his death. His most notable feat came in 1476, when he killed the Wallachian Templar Vlad Țepeș during a Hungarian uprising. Although historical records describe Pasha as dying in 1487, the mobile game Assassin's Creed Rebellion shows him still being active in 1495. After his death, Pasha was succeeded as Mentor by his apprentice, Yusuf Tazim, and left behind ten memoir pages that led to his Assassin armor, which he had hidden inside the Hagia Sophia. The memoir pages and Pasha's armor would later be retrieved by Ezio in 1511.

Bayezid II 

Bayezid II (3 December 1447 – 26 May 1512) was the eighth Sultan of the Ottoman Empire from 1481 to 1512. During his reign, he consolidated the Empire, and welcomed many escaped Jewish refugees seeking to escape the Spanish Inquisition. Despite choosing his eldest son Ahmet as his heir, he was forced to abdicate the Ottoman throne to his youngest son, Selim I, in April 1512, and died one month later. While Bayezid does not physically appear in Assassin's Creed: Revelations, he is frequently mentioned.

Selim I 

Selim I (10 October 1470 – 22 September 1520) (voiced by Mark Ivanir), also known as Selim the Grim or Selim the Resolute, was the youngest son of Bayezid II who succeeded him as Sultan of the Ottoman Empire, reigning from 1512 until his death in 1520. His rule was marked by the enormous expansion of the Empire, in particular the conquest of the Levant, Hejaz, Tihamah, and Egypt, which became known together as the Mamluk Sultanate. He was succeeded by his only living son, Suleiman. Although most of Assassin's Creed: Revelations takes place during Selim's fight with his brother Ahmet over the claim to the Ottoman throne, Selim himself has only a few references throughout the main story and appears briefly at the end, when he confronts Ahmet and Ezio shortly after forcing Bayezid to abdicate. Proclaiming his new authority as Sultan, Selim murders Ahmet, but spares Ezio due to Suleiman's endorsement, instead ordering him to leave Constantinople and never return.

Ahmet 

Ahmet ( 1465 – 25 April 1512) (voiced by Tamer Hassan) is the main antagonist of Assassin's Creed: Revelations. He is an Ottoman Şehzade (prince), the eldest living son of Bayezid II, the older brother of Selim I, and Suleiman's uncle. Between him and Selim, Bayezid favored Ahmet as an heir due to his calm and calculated demeanor. This enraged Selim, who wanted the Ottoman throne for himself and began fighting his brother in 1509. Around the same time, Ahmet secretly joined the Templar Order, who promised him the power to end all feuds that divided men, and eventually became the Grand Master of the Byzantine Rite. Although Ahmet himself was Ottoman, he nonetheless helped the Templars infiltrate Constantinople to further their plans of re-establishing the Byzantine Empire. He also started an expedition to find the keys to Altaïr Ibn-LaʼAhad's library, believing it contained the location of the Isu's Grand Temple and would thus further the Templar cause. In 1511, Ahmet sets up an unsuccessful ambush to capture Suleiman, intending to have him rescued and appear as a brave hero. The plan is foiled by Ezio, who then investigates the Byzantine Templars at Suleiman's request, leading him to uncover Ahmet's betrayal. After learning Ezio has found all the library keys, Ahmet has his love interest, Sofia Sartor, kidnapped, to ransom her for the keys. After obtaining the keys, Ahmet tries to flee Constantinople, but is defeated by Ezio, just as Selim's army arrives. Proclaiming his authority as the new Sultan, Selim then executes Ahmet by strangling him and tossing him off a cliff.

Manuel Palaiologos 

Manuel Palaiologos (1454 – March 1512) (voiced by Vlasta Vrána) is the secondary antagonist of Assassin's Creed: Revelations. He is the heir to the lost Byzantine Empire throne and nephew to Constantine XI, as well as the second-in-command of the Byzantine Rite of the Templar Order. Posing as a wealthy Ottoman citizen, he conspires to take back Constantinople with the help of the Ottoman Prince Ahmet, and leads the search for the keys to Altaïr Ibn-LaʼAhad's library, which the Templars believe could further their cause. In 1512, he is assassinated by Ezio in the Byzantine-controlled city of Cappadocia.

Shahkulu 

Shahkulu (died March 1512) (voiced by Alex Ivanovici), also spelled Şahkulu, is the leader of the Şahkulu rebellion (which takes its name from him), a widespread pro-Shia and pro-Safavid uprising in Anatolia, directed against the Ottoman Empire. Born into a Turkmen tribe in eastern Anatolia, Shahkulu grew up witnessing his people being oppressed by the Ottomans. After an Ottoman ambush on his tribe left him orphaned and alone, Shahkulu, seeking revenge and a sense of belonging, joined the Byzantine Rite of the Templar Order. By 1511, he had become well known for his ruthlessness, especially towards Ottomans, and was in a partnership with Manuel Palaiologos, believing that if he helped him restore the Byzantine Empire, he would be generously rewarded. Although Shahkulu historically died in battle in July 1511, in the game he is shown surviving until 1512, when he is found in Cappadocia, violently beating Ottoman spies to death in a chapel. After surviving Ezio's initial assassination attempt, he is slain in the ensuing fight.

Leandros 
Leandros (died March 1511) (voiced by Steve Blum) is the captain of a Templar regiment stationed in Masyaf that is attempting to open the library of Altaïr Ibn-LaʼAhad. After his men capture Ezio when he first arrives in Masyaf, Leandros tries to hang him, but the Assassin escapes and eventually kills Leandros, taking from him the journal of Niccolò Polo.

Cyril of Rhodes 
Cyril of Rhodes (died 1511) is a former priest for the Eastern Orthodox Church and a member of the Byzantine Rite of the Templar Order. In 1511, he makes plans to assassinate Pachomius I, the Patriarch of Constantinople, who expelled and humiliated him in the past, but is killed by Ezio and one of his Assassin recruits before he has the chance to. Cyril of Rhodes' character model is also used in the game's multiplayer, under the title of "the Deacon".

Damat Ali Pasha 
Damat Ali Pasha (died 1511) is a member of the Byzantine Rite of the Templar Order, who used to serve Bayezid II, until the Sultan's conquering ambition declined. In 1511, Ezio and one of his Assassin recruits help Ali catch a thief who robbed him. Later, Ali unknowingly puts a bounty on the same Assassin apprentice that helped him, leading to the recruit hunting him down with Ezio's help. Ali's character model is also used in the game's multiplayer, under the title of "the Vizier".

Georgios Kostas 
Georgios Kostas (died 1511) is a member of the Byzantine Rite of the Templar Order with a reputation for incredible strength and brutality. Born in Greece, he left his birthplace in search for global recognition and became the champion of numerous fighting tournaments held in Thrace, catching the Templars' attention, who eventually inducted him into the Order. In 1511, Georgios is ordered to assassinate a printer in Constantinople, but is foiled by Ezio and one of his Assassin recruits, who later kill Georgios when he is targeting the printer's father. Georgios's character model is also used in the game's multiplayer, under the title of "the Champion".

Lysistrata 
Lysistrata (died 1511) is a wealthy actress from Constantinople and a member of the Byzantine Rite of the Templar Order. Using her charms, she lures away and murders Ottoman officials to benefit the Templar cause. In 1511, she is assassinated by Ezio and one of his Assassin recruits during a public performance. Lysistrata's character model is also used in the game's multiplayer, under the title of "the Thespian".

Mirela Djuric 
Mirela Djuric (died 1511) is a Romani thief and fortune teller and a member of the Byzantine Rite of the Templar Order. She manages the Templars' criminal network in Constantinople, and uses various tricks to swindle the poor out of their money. In 1511, she is tracked down by Ezio and one of his Assassin recruits with the help of other Romani, but she manages to escape. Later, she is finally killed while collecting ingredients for a poison. Mirela's character model is also used in the game's multiplayer, under the title of "the Trickster".

Odai Dunqas 
Odai Dunqas (died 1511) is a cousin of the first ruler of the Funj Sultanate and a member of the Byzantine Rite of the Templar Order. In 1511, he begins bribing merchants in the Assassin-controlled districts of Constantinople to raise their prices, so that the public's opinion would turn against the Assassins. He is eventually killed by Ezio and one of his Assassin recruits. Odai's character model is also used in the game's multiplayer, under the title of "the Guardian".

Vali cel Tradat 
Vali cel Tradat (died 1511) is a Wallachian noble and former Assassin, who joined the Byzantine Rite of the Templar Order after the Brotherhood made a truce with the Ottoman Empire. Because the Ottomans had conquered Wallachia, oppressed Vali's people, and killed his secret idol, Vlad Țepeș, Vali saw this as an act of betrayal and sought revenge against both the Assassins and the Ottomans—which the Templars promised to him. In 1511, while killing Assassins in Constantinople on the Templars' behalf, Vali is hunted down and finally slain by Ezio and one of his Assassin recruits. Vali's character model is also used in the game's multiplayer, under the title of "the Sentinel".

Vlad Țepeș 

Vlad III Țepeș (1431–1476), commonly known as Vlad the Impaler or Vlad Dracula, was Voivode of Wallachia three times between 1448 and his death in 1476, and secretly a member of the Templar Order. He was known for his ruthlessness towards his enemies, especially the Ottomans, whom he executed for the smallest of crimes, typically by impalement—hence his nickname. In 1476, he was killed by Ishak Pasha, the Mentor of the Ottoman Assassins, during a Hungarian uprising, and his decapitated head and sword were later brought to Constantinople as a trophy, where they were buried in a specially made prison. In 1511, Vlad's tomb is explored by Ezio, who retrieves his sword. While Vlad does not physically appear in Assassin's Creed: Revelations, he is mentioned several times, and his character model is used in the game's multiplayer, under the title of "the Count".

Abbas Sofian 
Abbas Sofian (1166–1247) (voiced by Nolan North in Assassin's Creed and by Yerman Gur in Assassin's Creed: Revelations) is a Syrian Assassin during the Middle Ages, who serves as Mentor from 1227, when he usurps the position from Altaïr, until his death in 1247. Raised as an Assassin from birth alongside Altaïr, the two became best friends during their childhood. However, their relationship became strained after Altaïr revealed to Abbas that his father, Ahmad Sofian, had killed himself to escape the shame of being indirectly responsible for the death of Altaïr's own father, Umar. Abbas, who had grown up believing his father had left the Brotherhood, labeled Altaïr a liar, and developed a lifelong hatred for him. After Altaïr kills their Mentor, Al Mualim, in 1191, Abbas stands against Altaïr, who wants to become the Brotherhood's new leader. He eventually repents and keeps a low profile during Altaïr's time as Mentor. When Altaïr and his family leave for Mongolia to deal with the threat presented by Genghis Khan, Abbas stages a secret coup d'état against Altaïr; killing his younger son, Sef Ibn-La'Ahad, and framing Altaïr's best friend and right-hand man, Malik Al-Sayf, who is thrown in prison and later executed as well. With Sef and Malik out of the way, Abbas holds the most power over the Brotherhood, and he implements a council with himself as its head. Eventually, he disbands the council, usurping the title of Mentor, and becomes the sole leader of the Levantine Assassins. Under Abbas' leadership, the Order declines and becomes corrupt. Additionally, Abbas spends most of his time hiding in Masyaf's fortress, fearing for his life. After Altaïr returns from his exile, the Assassins, disillusioned with Abbas' rule, join him again and help him get to Abbas, who is killed by Altaïr's newest invention: the Hidden Gun.

Darim Ibn-La'Ahad 
Darim Ibn-La'Ahad (1195 – unknown) (voiced by Michael Benyaer) is a Syrian Assassin during the Middle Ages, and the eldest son of Altaïr Ibn-LaʼAhad and Maria Thorpe. When he is in his early twenties, he journeys to Mongolia with his parents to assassinate Genghis Khan due to the threat he poses to the Assassin Order. Successful, they return to Masyaf in 1228, only to find that Abbas Sofian had usurped leadership of the Assassins and killed Darim's brother Sef. After Maria is also killed, Darim and Altaïr are forced to flee Masyaf. The two later have a falling out due to Altaïr's depression and obsession with the Apple of Eden, and Darim leaves him to support Sef's widow and children. In 1247, Altaïr returns alone and kills Abbas, reclaiming the title of Mentor. Darim returns soon after and stays in Masyaf until it is attacked by the Mongols in 1257. After repelling the attack, Altaïr, knowing the Mongols will return, decides to seal himself in the library he had built. Before that, he bids farewell to Darim, telling him to go and live his life. Darim then leaves for Alexandria to rejoin his sister-in-law and nieces.

Sef Ibn-La'Ahad 
Sef Ibn-La'Ahad (1197 –  1226) is a Syrian Assassin during the Middle Ages, and the youngest son of Altaïr and Maria. When his parents and older brother go to Mongolia to assassinate Genghis Khan, Sef stays in Masyaf to help Altaïr's friend Malik Al-Sayf lead the Assassin Order in their absence, and look after his wife and two daughters. However, two years before their return, Abbas Sofian decides to usurp leadership of the Assassins, and has his henchman Swami murder Sef in his sleep.

Niccolò and Maffeo Polo 

Niccolò ( 1230 –  1294) (voiced by Shawn Baichoo) and Maffeo Polo ( 1230 –  1309) were Venetian traveling merchants who were the father and uncle, respectively, of famed explorer Marco Polo. During their lifetimes, they established trading posts in Constantinople, Sudak, and the western part of the Mongol Empire. In the game, they are both portrayed as members of the Assassin Order, having been inducted by Altaïr in 1257, shortly before his death. Before their departure from Masyaf, Altaïr entrusts the Polo brothers with his Codex and five of the keys to his underground library, instructing them to conceal the keys and spread the Assassins' teachings. The brothers would later hide the keys in Constantinople, and establish Assassin guilds in several of the places they visited, thus ensuring the survival of the Assassin Order after the fall of Masyaf to the Mongols.

Haras 
Haras (died 1189) (voiced by Michael Benyaer) is a Syrian Assassin during the Middle Ages who, disillusioned with the Assassin cause, betrays them and helps the Templars attack Masyaf in 1189. Altaïr leads the other Assassins in fending off the attack, and rescues Al Mualim, who had been taken captive during the battle, killing Haras in the process. Haras's character model is also used in the game's multiplayer, under the title of "the Crusader".

Flavia Auditore 
Flavia Auditore (May 1513 – unknown) (voiced by Angela Galuppo) is the daughter of Ezio and Sofia Sartor, and an ancestor of Desmond Miles. She appears in the animated short Assassin's Creed: Embers.

Marcello Auditore 
Marcello Auditore (October 1514 – unknown) is Ezio and Sofia's son and Flavia's younger brother.

Characters of Assassin's Creed III

Connor

Ratonhnhaké:ton (4 April 1756 – unknown) (voiced by Noah Watts), better known as Connor, is the protagonist of Assassin's Creed III. He also makes a minor appearance in Assassin's Creed III: Liberation. He is an Anglo-Kanienʼkehá꞉ka Assassin who struggles to protect the Haudenosaunee as he fights alongside the Patriots during the American Revolutionary War. He initially develops a strong working relationship with George Washington, though this falls apart after Connor discovers that Washington was behind an attack on his village in his youth, which resulted in his mother's death and set him on the path to become an Assassin. After the Revolutionary War, he focuses on rebuilding the Colonial Brotherhood of Assassins, which had been all but eradicated by the Templars decades prior, and becomes its Mentor. He also marries a woman from a nearby tribe and has three children; the youngest of whom, Io꞉nhiòte, possesses the rare ability of Eagle Vision. Connor is the son of Haytham Kenway and Kaniehtí꞉io, the grandson of Edward Kenway, and an ancestor of Desmond Miles through the paternal line.

Haytham Kenway 

Haytham E. Kenway (4 December 1725 – 16 September 1781) (voiced by Adrian Hough) is the secondary protagonist and the main antagonist of Assassin's Creed III, being playable in the game's first three sequences. He also appears as a supporting character in Assassin's Creed Rogue, and most of his life is chronicled in the novel Assassin's Creed: Forsaken. Haytham is a British nobleman, the son of Master Assassin Edward Kenway, who is manipulated into joining the Templar Order by its Grand Master, Reginald Birch, after the latter secretly engineers Edward's murder when Haytham is ten years old. Spending years to train with the Templars and search for his half-sister, Jennifer Scott (who was kidnapped on the night of Edward's murder), Haytham is eventually promoted to the rank of Grand Master of the Colonial Rite of Templars, and sent to North America to find the Isu's Grand Temple. Though the expedition proves to be unsuccessful, it leads to Haytham meeting and falling in love with Kaniehtí:io, a member of the local Kanien'kehá:ka tribe. However, he eventually leaves her to focus on his Templar affairs and search for Jennifer, before their son, Connor, is born. Eventually finding and rescuing Jennifer, Haytham discovers the truth about Birch's deception, and kills him in revenge. Over the following years, Haytham works with Shay Cormac to build a strong Templar presence in the American Colonies and exterminate the Colonial Brotherhood of Assassins. However, most of their work would be undone by Connor years later, after he became an Assassin. Though Haytham and Connor become allies at one point and consider unifying their orders, they both ultimately realise that peace between the Assassins and Templars is impossible. As such, Haytham would ultimately be killed by his son in 1781, while trying to protect his Templar friend Charles Lee.

Achilles Davenport 
Achilles Davenport ( 1710 – September 1781) (voiced by Roger Aaron Brown) is a major supporting character in Assassin's Creed III, and the main antagonist/antihero of Assassin's Creed Rogue. He is a Master Assassin who serves as Mentor of the Colonial Brotherhood from 1746 until his retirement in 1763. Trained by Ah Tabai, the Mentor of the West Indies Brotherhood, Achilles travels to the American Colonies in 1740 to establish his own branch of the Brotherhood, which he develops over the following years by recruiting additional members. By 1752, due to the lack of a strong Templar presence in North America at the time, Achilles and his Brotherhood have started to focus on finding Pieces of Eden before the Templars can. Around the same time, Achilles' wife Abigail and son Connor die of typhoid fever, greatly affecting the Mentor, who becomes more distant and reckless with his actions as a result. In 1755, after his apprentice's, Shay Cormac, attempt to retrieve a Piece of Eden results in Lisbon's destruction, Achilles refuses to listen to Shay's pleas to stop the search for the Pieces, resulting in the latter betraying the Brotherhood and eventually joining the Templar Order. With Shay's help, the Templars purge the Colonial Brotherhood over the following years, though Achilles himself is spared by the Templar Grand Master, Haytham Kenway, at Shay's request, so that he could warn the other Assassins of the Pieces' destructive capabilities after witnessing them first hand. After being crippled by Haytham, Achilles retires to his homestead, becoming a hermit, until he meets Ratonhnaké:ton in 1769, who is eager to become an Assassin. Though reluctant at first, he trains Ratonhnaké:ton in the Assassins' ways, and renames him Connor to help him blend in with colonial society. Achilles and Connor frequently argue during the latter's quest to eliminate the Colonial Templars, as Connor hopes to make peace with them since they share a common goal. Despite this, the two develop a genuine father-son bond, and Connor even helps Achilles find a new purpose in life by bringing in new people to his homestead, turning it into a small community. Achilles eventually passes away of old age in 1781, and his death is mourned by Connor and all the homesteaders.

Kaniehtí꞉io 
Kaniehtí꞉io (1731 – 2 November 1760) (voiced by Kaniehtiio Horn), also known as Ziio, is a Kanien'keha:ka (Mohawk) clan woman and warrior, and the mother of Ratonhnhaké꞉ton / Connor. Unlike her fellow villagers, who prefer to stay neutral to protect their sacred sanctuary, she fights settlers encroaching on her people's lands. In 1754, she becomes allies with Haytham Kenway, who seeks access to the sanctuary. The two share a brief relationship, which results in Connor's birth. However, Ziio is left to raise their son alone, as Haytham abandons her after she accuses him of simply using her to achieve his goal. When her son is four, Ziio dies in an attack on their village ordered by George Washington; Connor grows up believing Haytham's subordinate Charles Lee is responsible, which sets him on the path to join the Assassins.

Kanenʼtó꞉kon 
Kanenʼtó꞉kon (1756 – 17 June 1778) (voiced by Akwiratékha Martin) is a member of the Kanien'kehá:ka nation in the Mohawk Valley and a close childhood friend of Connor. Although he initially advocates for the Kanien'kehá:ka to remain neutral in the American Revolutionary War, he and several other of his village's warriors believe that they can protect their people by siding with the British. He is manipulated by Charles Lee into believing that Connor had joined George Washington in a campaign against the Mohawk people, prompting him to attack his former friend when he tries to intervene in a Mohawk ambush on colonial soldiers. Pinned to the ground and vulnerable to a lethal blow, Connor is forced to stab Kanenʼtó꞉kon in the neck with his Hidden Blade, killing him.

Oiá꞉ner 
Oiá꞉ner is the Clan Mother of the Kanien'kehá:ka village of Kanatahséton. She and the other Kanien'kehá:ka in the village serve as protectors of the sacred ground on which both their village and the Grand Temple stood. Oiá꞉ner is also the keeper of the tribe's "Crystal Ball", a Piece of Eden which allows anyone to communicate with the Isu Juno. In 1769, Oiá꞉ner shows the Crystal Ball to Connor when he returns from a hunt and allows him to interact with it. Through the Crystal Ball, Juno informs Connor of his destiny as an Assassin and urges him to leave the village and seek out Achilles Davenport. Many years later, Oiá꞉ner meets an adult Connor and tells him of the whereabouts of Kanenʼtó꞉kon and other Kanien'kehá:ka men, who are attempting to attack Continental soldiers. Sometime after Kanenʼtó꞉kon's death, Oiá꞉ner speaks with Conor, and reveals that she plans to move their people west, far from the American Revolutionary War, like many of the other nations. After his unpleasant reaction, she tells him that she would do what was best for her people, and Connor leaves the village. On his return some years later, he finds the village deserted except for an old hunter, who tells him that his people have already left.

Robert Faulkner 
Robert Faulkner (voiced by Kevin McNally) (1715 – unknown) is an elderly sailor and Assassin who serves as Connor's first mate aboard the Aquila. Although he is the fourth generation in his family to become a sailor, he is the first to be recruited into the Assassin Brotherhood. Faulkner started off in the Royal Navy, but after finding that his career is stalling (partly due to his inability to purchase commissions), he went to work for the United Company of Merchants. In 1753, Faulkner disappears from the historical record, presumed dead—because it was around this time that he joined the Assassins as first mate of the Aquila. Faulkner is sought after as a mariner. He has a reputation for having a disciplined crew, avoiding trouble, and predicting the weather accurately. When the Aquila is nearly destroyed in 1768, Faulkner retires to a shack near Achilles Davenport's homestead, trying to drink his sorrows away. He finds new purpose in life when he meets Connor a few years later, who repairs the Aquila and becomes its captain.

George Washington 

George Washington (voiced by Robin Atkin Downes in Assassin's Creed III and by Tod Fennell in Assassin's Creed Rogue) (22 February 1732 – 14 December 1799) was the Commander-in-Chief of the Continental Army during the American Revolutionary War from 1775 to 1783, and later served as the first President of the United States from 30 April 1789 to 4 March 1797. Prior to the Revolutionary War, Washington also fought in the Seven Years' War and led several attacks against neutral or enemy Native tribes, including the neutral village of Kanatahséton in 1760. During the Revolutionary War, Washington is targeted by the Templars, in particular his own subordinate and political rival Charles Lee, who is angered that he had been passed over for the position of Commander-in-Chief, leading Connor to inform Washington of the existence of both the Assassins and the Templars in order to protect him. Although the Continental Army initially suffers many losses under Washington's command, Connor and his Assassin apprentices help win the army several small victories. Over time, Washington develops a strong working relationship with Connor, thought this falls apart after the latter discovers Washington was behind the Kanatahséton attack, which killed his mother, and now plans a second attack after Lee manipulated Connor's people into siding with the Loyalists. Nevertheless, Connor remains loyal to the Patriot cause, and thanks to his efforts, the Continental Army ultimately emerges victorious in 1783. After the war, Washington seeks Connor's help in disposing of an Apple of Eden he had seized, which has been giving him nightmares of an alternate timeline where Washington ruled over the United States as a tyrant. Thanks to these visions, as well as Connor's words of advice, Washington would become inspired to be a just leader for the American people when he was later elected President.

Samuel Adams 

Samuel Adams (voiced by Mark Lindsay Chapman) (27 September 1722 – 2 October 1803) was an American statesman, political philosopher, a Sons of Liberty Patriot and one of the Founding Fathers of the United States. During the American Revolution, Adams meets and becomes a trusted associate of Connor, after Achilles Davenport tells him to find Adams on his first trip to Boston. Connor would subsequently aid Adams and the Sons of Liberty several times throughout the Revolution, most notably during the Boston Tea Party in 1773.

Benjamin Franklin 

Benjamin Franklin (voiced by Jim Ward in Assassin's Creed III and by Rick Jones in Assassin's Creed Rogue) (17 January 1706 – 17 April 1790) was a Freemason, a noted polymath, and one of the Founding Fathers of the United States. Franklin is first encountered by Haytham Kenway in Boston in 1754, when he requests the latter's help in finding the stolen pages of his Poor Richard's Almanack. Around the same time, Franklin was being unknowingly used by the Templars to study the Precursor box they had seized, which was given to him by William Johnson. However, the Assassins Shay Cormac and Hope Jensen are able to hijack the research by posing as associates of Johnson. They help Franklin with his experiments on the box, generating a map which shows the locations of various Precursor sites. By 1756, the Assassins have commissioned Franklin to develop various weapons for them, including a prototype grenade launcher, though this would later be given to Shay, who visits Franklin at his lab in New York after his defection to the Templars. During the American Revolutionary War, Franklin is appointed the first United States Ambassador to France and moves to Paris, where he unexpectedly encounters Shay again in 1776. After Shay saves him from a gang of street criminals, Franklin helps him infiltrate the Palace of Versailles for a supposed "business meeting" (in reality Shay came to retrieve the Precursor box from the Assassins, who were having a secret meeting there). Despite his many interactions with various Assassins and Templars throughout his life, Franklin doesn't appear to be aware of the existence of either of the two orders.

Reginald Birch 
Reginald Birch (voiced by Gideon Emery) (1705–1757) is the Grand Master of the British Rite of the Templar Order and successful English businessman. Reginald meets Haytham, the son of Birch's employer—Edward Kenway—at a young age. He recruites Haytham into the Templars after Edward dies, personally involving himself with the boy's training. In 1754, after Haytham retrieves the key to the undisclosed Grand Temple, Reginald secures passage to Boston for Haytham to find the First Civilization storehouse and establish a permanent Templar presence in British America. When Haytham discovers Reginald's involvement in the kidnapping of his half-sister, Jennifer Scott, and the murder of his father, he storms Reginald's chateau with Jim Logan and Jennifer. Afterwards, Birch is killed by Jennifer with a sword that Haytham had embedded into Birch's bedroom door.

Samuel Smythe 
Samuel Smythe captains the Providence during Haytham's journey across the Atlantic Ocean.

Silas Thatcher 
Silas Thatcher (1720–1754) is a high-ranking officer of the colonial militia and prolific slave trader. He is responsible for the ransacking of Benjamin Church's house, and his subsequent interrogation alongside a man called "Cutter". However, shortly after he leaves, Haytham and Charles free their associate. Later, while posted at Southgate Fort in Boston, Silas receives deliveries of prisoners from Mohawk people, including Kaniehtí:io. In 1754, a convoy full of Mohawk tribespeople is commandeered by Haytham and his men as a means to enter the fortification. Shortly after discovering the ruse, Silas orders his men to fire on the Templars, but is cornered by Haytham and executed by Church as payback.

Charles Lee 

Charles Lee (voiced by Neil Napier) (1732–1782) appears in Assassin's Creed III. He is a British-born soldier, and later, a general of the Continental Army during the American Revolutionary War who allies himself with the Templar Order and its Grand Master, Haytham. It is implied that Lee sets fire to Ratonhnhaké꞉ton's village, killing his mother in the process where the then young Ratonhnhaké꞉ton' vowed to kill him. Many years later, during a meeting with George Washington, they meet again but fail to recognize him until he gets falsely arrested for counterfeiting along with a Templar called Thomas Hickey. Sarcastically congratulating him for tracking him down, he frames him for a Templar plot to kill George Washington, which is foiled when Washington is saved by Ratonhnhaké꞉ton'. He resides in Fort George for his "own protection" some years later, and is ordered to leave for Boston by Haytham shortly before the latter's death. Succeeding him as the next Grand Master, he vows to make his tormentor suffer, only to be chased by him into a half constructed ferry that is set alight, and is saved at the last minute when part of the ship collapses on the Assassin, wounding him in the hip. Using the opportunity to ask him why he continues to "fight after all his allies have abandoned him", he is told "because no one else will" before being shot in the side by him. He is tracked down by his pursuer to a tavern in Monmouth County, where they both share a bottle of whiskey before being fatally stabbed in the chest by the Assassin. The medallion (the key meant for Desmond) is taken from his body and, shortly afterwards, is buried in the grave of Connor Davenport, Achilles' son and the namesake of Ratonhnhaké꞉ton.

John Pitcairn 

John Pitcairn (voiced by Robert Lawrenson) (1722–1775) is a Scottish-born a member of the Royal Marine Corps and the Templar Order. He is rescued by Haytham and Charles while he is being harassed by General Braddock. He is assassinated by Ratonhnhaké꞉ton during a battle between the Patriots and "Redcoats".

Marquis de Lafayette 

Marie-Joseph Paul Yves Roch Gilbert du Motier, Marquis de La Fayette (voiced by Vince Corazza) (1757–1834) often known as Lafayette, is a French aristocrat and military officer born in south central France. During the American Revolutionary War, Lafayette serves as a Major-General in the Continental Army under George Washington. Blocked by British spies who learned of his support for the Patriots, Lafayette disguises himself as a woman to board a ship to America in 1777. He recounts this to Ratonhnhaké꞉ton' while camping in Valley Forge that winter. On June 28, 1778, Lafayette leads a battalion in the battle of Monmouth, when he is given strange orders by Charles Lee to advance into enemy lines without sufficient numbers. Ratonhnhaké꞉ton' deduces Lee is trying to make Washington appear incompetent. In 1781, Lafayette visits the Davenport Homestead to help Ratonhnhaké꞉ton' gather a fleet to breach Fort George in New York. After Ratonhnhaké꞉ton' gains the French Navy's support, Lafayette meets with him and Stephane Chapheau underground and shows them a tunnel into the military district, so Ratonhnhaké꞉ton' can assassinate Charles in the midst of the bombardment. After the war, Lafayette returns to France and takes part in the French Revolution, bringing democracy and radical national reform to France. He goes into exile because he advocates for a constitutional monarchy instead of the empire that had emerged from the chaos in France.

Thomas Jefferson 

Thomas Jefferson (13 April 1743 – 4 July 1826) was one of the American Founding Fathers of the United States, the principal author of the Declaration of Independence and the third President of the United States.

When Ratonhnhaké꞉ton crashes the Aquila into another ship off the shore of New York City, George travels to the docks to investigate the disturbance. Thomas seizes this opportunity to infiltrate Washington's fortress. He is later quickly overwhelmed and requires Ratonhnhaké꞉ton's assistance to retreat. Shaun claims Thomas advocated the castration of homosexuals; but he was liberalizing the law in Virginia, which previously punished anyone convicted of sodomy with death.

Edward Braddock 

Edward Braddock (1695–1755), nicknamed the Bulldog by his soldiers, is a member of the Templar Order and general in the British Army. He appears in Haytham's story in Assassin's Creed III, and participates in the plot to kill Edward Kenway and act as a friend and mentor in the Dutch Campaign. During the French and Indian War, Braddock is the commander-in-chief for the thirteen colonies of British America. He had several soldiers under his command, including John Pitcairn and Charles Lee, whom he rarely saw due to their allegiance to the Templar cause. Over the course of the war, Braddock turns away from the Templar ideals and impedes the Order's goals in the colonies, much to the chagrin of the other members. Braddock is confronted by Haytham when the latter attempts to recruit John Pitcairn for the expedition to find a First Civilization storehouse. Braddock is killed by Haytham to gain Kaniehtí꞉io's trust. Haytham takes the Templar ring from Braddock's finger, which is later given to Charles upon the latter's initiation into the Templar Order.

William Johnson 

Sir William Johnson, 1st Baronet (voiced by Julian Casey) (1715–1774) is an Anglo-Irish official of the British Empire and a member of the Templar Order.

As a member of the Templars, William manages the land and property acquired by the Order's Colonial Rite. During a meeting with several clan leaders, he is assassinated by Ratonhnhaké꞉ton.

Nicholas Biddle 

Nicholas Biddle (1750–1778) is one of the first five captains of the Continental Navy who later joins the Royal Navy. Due to his secret role as a Templar official and intervention in the Assassin ships' trades and factory prices, he is assassinated by Ratonhnhaké꞉ton in a battle with the HMS Yarmouth offshore Martha's Vineyard and sinks with his ship, the USS Randolph.

Israel Putnam 

Israel Putnam (1718–1790), popularly known as "Old Put", was an American army general officer who fought with distinction at the Battle of Bunker Hill during the American Revolutionary War (1775–1783).

Ratonhnhaké꞉ton helps him in the Bunker Hill battle by fighting John Pitcairn and fending off the naval ship attacks near Boston Harbour.

François Joseph Paul, Comte de Grasse 

Admiral François Joseph Paul de Grasse (1722–1788) was a French Naval career officer who rose to the rank of admiral. He is best known for his command of the French fleet at the Battle of the Chesapeake in 1781 in the last year of the American Revolutionary War.

He is assisted by Ratonhnhaké꞉ton and the Aquila at first in the battle who, with the Vengeur du Peuple and Saint-Esprit, brave British forces under Thomas Graves until reinforcements arrive.

Thomas Hickey 

Thomas Hickey (died 1776) was an Irish-born soldier in the British Army, serving in the French and Indian War, but later joined the Continental Army. He went to Colonial America in 1752 and was stationed in Boston.

He is assigned as an assistant to William Johnson, and joins the Order himself before being executed for "treachery". He and Haytham are recruits in the Order, looking for the precursor site at Ziio's village.

Miko 
"Miko" (died 1754) is the alias of the leader of the British Brotherhood of Assassins alongside Edward Kenway, and the holder of the Grand Temple Key. He is assassinated by Haytham for the key at the Royal Opera House.

Characters of Assassin's Creed III: Liberation

Aveline de Grandpré 

Aveline de Grandpré (20 June 1747 – unknown) is a Louisiana Creole Assassin who lives in New Orleans during the French and Indian War and the Spanish occupation in Louisiana in the middle of the 18th century. She is also involved in the Seven Years' War and the American Revolutionary War. She is recruited by the Assassins in 1759 to defend abused slaves, fight for freedom, and eliminate targets in New Orleans.

Antonio de Ulloa 

Antonio de Ulloa (1716–1795) is a Spanish general, explorer, author, astronomer, colonial administrator, and the first Spanish governor of Louisiana. As a Templar, he is pursued by the Aveline during the Louisiana Rebellion, but is spared by Grandpré under the promise to go into exile.

Agaté 
Agaté is a former slave who appears in Assassin's Creed III: Liberation as the leader of the local Brotherhood of Assassins cell in colonial French Louisiana, and primarily operates from his hideout in the Louisiana Bayou. Enslaved from a young age, Agaté comes into contact with revolutionary disruptor François Mackandal, who teaches him the ways of the Assassins. After his Mentor's death in 1758, Agaté travels to Louisiana, a marked man, and hides in the bayou. He subsequently recruits Aveline and Gérald Blanc, whom he trains to be his agents in New Orleans. Although Agaté cares for his students, he is secretive in his dealings with them. Due to Aveline's natural impulsiveness and disinclination to follow orders, Agaté clashes with her frequently and begins to doubt her loyalty to the cause. Over the years, their mutual distrust of each another cause them to grow apart. When Aveline returns to Agaté in 1777 to reveal the identity of the true leader of Louisiana's Templar Order, he attacks her, believing her to have betrayed the Assassins. She wins, causing Agaté, who is overwhelmed with humiliation, to leap to his death from the top of his treehouse.

Baptiste 
Baptiste is a former Assassin and voodoo leader who poses as the deceased François Mackandal and operates in the Bayou surrounding New Orleans. Secretly working for the "Company Man" with Rafael Joaquín de Ferrer, Baptiste aspires to become a formal a member of the Templar Order. He is also a personal enemy of Agaté. Sometime in 1765, "Mackandal" amasses a small following, though he sends a letter to one of his acolytes stating that he is "in want of nothing but more men to join his ranks" of his cult for a "sacred ceremony" on the Eve of Saint John. The letter is intercepted by the Aveline, shortly after she assassinates the troops at one of his bases, a wrecked ship in the marshlands, with the smuggler Élise Lafleur providing her with the information and transport to get there. Aveline and Élise locate Baptiste after she clears the man's second base, and spies on his conversation with de Ferrer, learning of his plans to poison the nobles of New Orleans. Aveline faces Baptiste in a showdown and is victorious.

He is portrayed by Michael K. Williams in the Assassin's Creed film.

Gérald Blanc 
Gérald Blanc was an accountant living in New Orleans who is Aveline's confidante. At some point in his life, he is recruited into the Brotherhood of Assassins by Agaté.

Madeleine de L'Isle 
Madeleine de L'Isle is the wife of Philippe Olivier de Grandpré, Aveline's stepmother who aids her efforts to discreetly liberate the slaves of New Orleans.

Characters of Assassin's Creed IV: Black Flag

Edward James Kenway 

Edward Kenway (10 March 1693 – 3 December 1735) is a Welsh-born privateer-turned-pirate. He is Haytham's father, Ratonhnhaké꞉ton grandfather, and an ancestor of Desmond Miles. He is active in the Caribbean from 1715 to 1722 during the Golden Age of Piracy, and is known for commanding the brig named Jackdaw. Edward formally joins the Brotherhood of Assassins when he retires to London in 1722. He is voiced by actor Matt Ryan.

Adéwalé 
Adéwalé (1692–1758) is an Assassin of African descent who appears in Assassin's Creed IV: Black Flag, Assassin's Creed Freedom Cry, and Assassin's Creed Rogue. Born a slave on a sugar plantation in Trinidad, he meets Edward Kenway while they are both in captivity. After helping each other escape, he aids Edward in stealing a Spanish brig. He serves as Edward's quartermaster aboard the stolen ship, renamed the Jackdaw, for several years before leaving to join the Assassins. In Freedom Cry he aids the Maroon cause on Saint-Domingue (present day Haiti), where he meets the future mother of his child. In Rogue he is killed by Shay Patrick Cormac. He is portrayed by Tristan D. Lalla.

Duncan Walpole 
Duncan Walpole is a member of the British Brotherhood of Assassins during the early 18th century. Duncan later defects and attempts to join the Templars of the West Indies, but is encountered and killed by Edward Kenway, who appropriates Walpole's costume and equipment, and learns about his dealings with Laureano de Torres y Ayala. Walpole is portrayed by Callum Turner in the 2016 Assassin's Creed film.

Julien du Casse 
Julien du Casse is a French arms dealer and an experienced privateer and mercenary, and is designed to be the nephew of the real-life French privateer Jean-Baptiste Du Casse. He is a member of the Templar Order in the West Indies, and also serves as Laureano's hitman. He has a discreet hideout on Great Inagua where he carries out his affairs, which later comes into the possession of Edward Kenway after he is killed.

Charles Vane 

Charles Vane was a British pirate captain.

In Black Flag, Vane is depicted as Edward's friend, and one of the founders of the pirate republic of Nassau. Edward is also marooned on the deserted island of Isla Providencia along with Vane, though the latter is driven mad with desperation and turns on his former friend before being disarmed and abandoned. He is voiced by Ralph Ineson.

Anne Bonny 

Anne Bonny was a notorious female Irish pirate who operated in the West Indies. She, along with "Calico" Jack Rackham and Mary Read, raised a small crew to execute a series of swift robberies. However, the entire crew was later arrested by the British authorities a few months later and taken to Kingston for trial, though both her and Read were able to stay their execution by relying on the defense of pleading the belly.

In Black Flag she initially appears a young barmaid at the Old Avery tavern in Nassau. Anne successfully escapes prison with the help of Edward and the Assassin leader Ah Tabai. She becomes an associate of Edward's and joins his crew as quartermaster aboard the Jackdaw, replacing Adéwalé. When Edward leaves for England in October 1722, Anne decides to stay in the West Indies.

Bartholomew Roberts 

Bartholomew Roberts (1682–1722), born John Roberts, was a Welsh pirate who raided ships in the Caribbean and on the West African coast between 1719 and 1722.

In Black Flag he is depicted as a Sage, a reincarnation of the Isu Aita, who has a nihilistic worldview. He works with Edward to locate the fabled Observatory, an Isu facility designed for surveillance, but betrays him and turns him over to British authorities. He is killed by Kenway off the coast of Principé.

Benjamin Hornigold 

Benjamin Hornigold (1680s – 1719) was an English pirate from 1715 to 1718. In Black Flag, he serves as a mentor to Edward and as one of the founders of the Pirate Republic at Nassau. After Nassau is annexed by British forces, he joins the Templar Order.

Mary Read 

Mary Read (c. 1685 – 1721) was a notable English female pirate known for posing as a man throughout her life to accomplish her goals. In Black Flag she is depicted as a member of the Assassin Order, trained by Ah Tabai. To further her exploits in the male-dominated world of piracy, she adopts the persona of James Kidd, a Scottish sailor and illegitimate son of William Kidd who is tried by the British parliament and executed for piracy after returning from a voyage to the Indian Ocean. As James Kidd, she is recognized as one of the founders of the pirate-dominated Republic of Nassau. She later perishes in prison, her health severely deteriorated after childbirth.

Blackbeard 

Edward Thatch (1680–1718), better known by his alias Blackbeard, was a pirate captain who sailed the West Indies and the American colonies during the early 18th century, on a ship named the Queen Anne's Revenge. He is the namesake of a Black Flag multiplayer-focused DLC titled Blackbeard's Wrath, and is voiced by Mark Bonnar.

Jack Rackham 

John "Jack" Rackham (1682–1720), more commonly known as Calico Jack, was a Jamaican-born British pirate who operated in the West Indies during the early 18th century. In Black Flag, he serves as quartermaster under Charles Vane, and later rallies enough support from the crew to depose him as captain in November 1718 and setting him and Edward adrift in a damaged sloop. Rackham returns to Nassau to accept the King's Pardon, and returns to life as a pirate in August 1720. Together with Anne Bonny and Mary Read, they plunder and pillage the region for a few months before being arrested by the British authorities. Rackham is later tried and executed for piracy in Port Royal on 18 November 1720.

Laureano de Torres y Ayala 

Laureano José de Torres Ayala a Duadros Castellanos, marqués de Casa Torres (1645–1722), often known as simply Laureano de Torres y Ayala, was the Spanish Governor of Florida from 1693 to 1699, Governor of Cuba on two occasions between 1707 and 1716. He appears in Assassin's Creed IV: Black Flag as the Grand Master of the Templar Order in the Caribbean, and serves as the game's primary antagonistic figure.

Stede Bonnet 

Stede Bonnet (c. 1688 – 1718) was an early-18th-century Barbadian pirate of English descent who sailed the Eastern Seaboard of the Thirteen Colonies with his crew, and known for his brief association with Blackbeard. In Black Flag, he appears as one of Edward's recurring associates.

Woodes Rogers 

Woodes Rogers (voiced by Shaun Dingwall) (c. 1679 – 1732) was an English privateer, and the first Royal Governor of the Bahamas. In Black Flag, he is depicted as a member of the Templar Order in the West Indies.

Lawrence Prince 

Lawrence Prince (1630s – 1715s) was a Dutch buccaneer, privateer, and officer under Captain Sir Henry Morgan. He and John Morris led one of the columns against Panama in 1671. He is assassinated by Edward Kenway in his search for Bartholomew.

Characters of Assassin's Creed Rogue

Shay Patrick Cormac 
Shay Patrick Cormac (12 September 1731 – unknown) is the protagonist of Assassin's Creed Rogue, an Irish-American Assassin who defects to the Templar Order at the onset of Seven Years' War in 1755 after becoming disillusioned with the Assassins' tactics, in particular their willingness to sacrifice civilians, and defects to the opposing Templar Order, who believe in peace through order and control. Shay is largely responsible for facilitating the extermination of the Colonial Brotherhood in the ensuing years when the war expands into the American theatre of the worldwide Seven Years' War, and would go down in the history of both orders as one of the deadliest Assassin hunters to have ever lived. He is also responsible for the murder of Arno Dorian's father at the Palace of Versailles. He is voiced and portrayed by Steven Piovesan through performance capture.

Shay makes no further appearances in the Assassin's Creed franchise, though his Templar outfit is unlockable to wear for player characters in subsequent titles. Shay is referenced in the 2016 novel Assassin's Creed: Last Descendants through his grandson Cudgel Cormac, a professional Assassin hunter who continued his grandfather's legacy in protecting the Templar cause during the American Civil War.

Liam O'Brien 
Liam O'Brien (1726–1760) is a member of the Colonial Brotherhood of Assassins operating in the British Colonies during the Seven Years' War. As a childhood friend of Shay, Liam is responsible for bringing Shay into the Brotherhood. In spite of Liam being a few years his elder, Shay forms a brotherly bond with him, even though Liam is wiser and more experienced. Liam is killed by Shay for a Precursor artifact when he joined the Templars.

Hope Jensen 
Hope Jensen (1732–1759) is a member of the Colonial Brotherhood of Assassins operating in North America during the Seven Years' War. Mentored by Achilles, she controls much of New York City's organized crime, providing her with an effective information network. She is killed by Shay.

Kesegowaase 
Kesegowaase (1730–1757) is a Maliseet a member of the Colonial Brotherhood of Assassins. At a young age, he serves the French Army as a mercenary along with other members of his tribe. After meeting Achilles, he joins the Colonial Brotherhood. Through Kesegowaase, the Assassins gain allies within nearly every French-aligned tribe. After the outbreak of the French and Indian War, Achilles tasks Kesegowaase and Liam with eliminating George Monro, but as they fail to kill him in the Siege of Fort William Henry, he rallies his men and attacks Albany, New York. Liam kills George Monro, while Kesegowaase fights Shay and is killed.

Le Chasseur 
Le Chasseur (died 1756) is a French spy operating in New York and the North Atlantic during the Seven Years' War. He is also an ally of the Colonial Assassins, supplying them with intelligence he learned from his contacts. By 1756, he serves as the commander of Fort La Croix near Albany. He is tasked with delivering poisonous gases to the Assassin-allied gangs of New York City, where they would be used against colonial authorities. However, when the fort is attacked, he is killed by Shay.

James Cook 

In the fictionalized version of the Seven Years' War depicted in Rogue, he provides assistance to Shay Cormac and Haytham Kenway during their campaigns against the French, and is oblivious to the existence of the Assassins and the Templars. He assists Shay in locating Chevalier de la Vérendrye, and is later promised sponsorship to fund his voyages to discover new lands by Haytham, ostensibly on behalf of the British government.

Lawrence Washington 

Lawrence Washington (1718–1752) was a sailor of the Royal Navy and the older half-brother of George Washington. In Rogue, he is depicted as a high-ranking a member of the Templar Order who helps establish the organization's presence at the Thirteen Colonies, and recovers an important artifact from a First Civilization Temple, the removal of which is supposedly responsible for setting off the 1751 Port-au-Prince earthquake. Just before his murder during a garden party by Shay Cormac, he asks his Templar associates to keep his brother out of the Templar cause.

Chevalier de la Vérendrye 

Louis-Joseph Gaultier de La Vérendrye (1717–1761), or simply Chevalier de la Vérendrye, was a French-Canadian explorer and trader. In Rogue he is presented as a member of the Assassin Brotherhood, who constantly behaves in a cantankerous and hostile manner towards Shay. Years later, he acts as a decoy to prevent the Templars from stopping Achilles and Liam from reaching a temple located in the Arctic region. Although he and his fleet ambush the Templars in a snowstorm, he is killed by Shay, who throws him overboard his ship.

George Monro 

George Monro (1700–1757) was a Lieutenant-Colonel of the British Army. In Rogue, he is presented as high-ranking a member of the Templar Order who authorizes Shay's rescue from sea, and seeks his help in purging Assassin-allied gangs who terrorize New York. Shay repays the favor by assisting Monro in various activities, like reinforcing his troops in the aftermath of the Siege of Fort William Henry. Monro is killed by the Assassins, and his death motivates Shay to formally join the Templar Order.

Christopher Gist 

Christopher Gist (1706–1759) was a British explorer, surveyor, and frontiersman. In Rogue, he is a member of the Templar Order who is rescued by Shay by George Monro's request, and later serves as Shay's first mate on his flagship The Morrigan.

James Wardrop 
James Wardrop (c. 1705 – 1754) is a merchant, politician, and a member of the British Rite of the Templar Order in the years leading up to the Seven Years' War. Operating along the Thirteen Colonies, Wardrop is the custodian of the Precursor manuscript who translates it. He is found negotiating with fellow Templar William Johnson at the Albany Congress, and is killed by Shay for the script after the Assassins infiltrate Fort Frederick.

Samuel Smith 
Samuel Smith (? – 1754) was a member of the British Rite of the Templar Order, operating in and around Great Britain's Thirteen Colonies in the 18th century. He is the treasurer of the Templars in the colonies, and is tasked by Lawrence Washington to safeguard the mysterious artifact known as the Precursor box. After Shay assassinates Lawrence, Smith leaves for Europe, where he intends to activate the box with the help of the continent's various scientists, but they are unable to. Two years later on his return trip to America, he is killed by Shay for the box at Terra Nova where he had made an encampment with Wardrop.

Jack Weeks 
Jack Weeks (1723-?) is an African-American a member of the British and Colonial Rites of the Templar Order. Lawrence entrusts the Precursor artifacts to him, Smith, and Wardrop. They inform him that they are fully occupied with making the artifacts work. He escapes when Shay kills Lawrence, but later joins forces with him to raid and destroy factories, various gangs, and forts.

Characters of Assassin's Creed Unity

Arno Victor Dorian 

Arno Victor Dorian (26 August 1768 – unknown) is a French-Austrian Assassin who is the main protagonist of Assassin's Creed Unity, and the childhood friend of Élise de La Serre. He initially joins the Brotherhood of Assassins out of a self-centered desire to seek closure for the death of Elise's father and the man who raised him after he is orphaned as a child. Arno is fully customizable, and his weapons, clothing, and abilities can be changed. He is portrayed by Dan Jeannotte through performance capture. Arno makes a cameo appearance in the 2016 Assassin's Creed film, where he is revealed to be an ancestor of Callum Lynch.

Élise de La Serre 
Élise de La Serre (1768 – 28 July 1794) is a Templar during the French Revolution, and Arno's companion and lover. Élise meets Arno the day his father was killed. Her father, Grand Master de La Serre, takes Arno in and raises him as his ward, allowing Arno and Élise to grow up together. After her father's death she partially blames Arno, as he did not delivered the anonymous warning of the assassination, and they part on bitter terms. After Arno becomes an Assassin he finds out that the Templar who ordered Élise's father's murder also wants her dead. Arno protects Élise when they reunite. He helps her find François-Thomas Germain, the Templar Sage who wants to rebuild the Templar Order. During the final confrontation between Arno, Élise, and Germain, she is killed, devastating Arno.

François de la Serre 

François de la Serre (1733–1789) is the Grand Master of the Parisian Rite of the Templar Order during the late 18th century. He is Élise's biological father, and Arno's adoptive father. He is a supporter of the absolutist monarchy of the Ancien Régime, and expels his lieutenant, François-Thomas Germain, from the Order for his radical ideas of unseating the aristocracy from power and giving it to the rising middle class. Germain considers de la Serre to be a complacent Grand Master who has forgotten the Templars' true goals, and has him killed in 1789 as part of a coup within the Order.

Pierre Bellec 

Pierre Bellec (voiced by Anthony Lemke) (c. 1740 – 1791) is a French-Canadian Master Assassin and former colonial soldier who is a veteran of the Seven Years' War, and was active during the French Revolution. At some point before the French Revolution, Bellec took a seat on the Assassin Council of the French Brotherhood. Arno Victor Dorian is his student.

Victor and Hugo 

Victor and his brother Hugo are two blacksmiths living in Versailles during the late 18th century. The names of Victor and Hugo are a reference to the French poet and novelist Victor Hugo. Hugo mentions to Arno that he and Victor were imprisoned for stealing a loaf of bread.

Le Roi des Thunes 

Le Roi des Thunes, or The King of Beggars, is the self-claimed king of the Cour des Miracles district. He forces the beggars of the district to pay him tributes, which are taken from rich people would pity them when they feign sickness. He tries to join the Templars under the command of de la Serre, but the latter rejects him, causing le Roi to make a vow to kill him. He is approached by Charles Gabriel Sivert, and joins the radical faction of the Templar order led by Germain. He murders de la Serre during the 1789 coup, and is assassinated by Arno two years later.

Aloys la Touche 

Aloys la Touche is the right-hand man and enforcer of Le Roi des Thunes, tasked with collecting the tributes from the beggars and punishing the ones who cannot pay. He is also a Templar under Germain's command, and after Le Roi des Thunes is assassinated by Arno, la Touche is tasked by Templar Maximilien de Robespierre to lead his Reign of Terror in Versailles. He is assassinated by Arno during an execution mass in 1793.

Marie Lévesque 

Marie Lévesque is a wealthy noble and one of Paris' main grain merchants. She is a Templar that supports Germain, and aids him in the coup against de la Serre. After Germain takes over, she is ordered to starve the people to make the revolution more violent and brutal. Her plans are discovered by Arno Dorian, who assassinates her during a lavish party in 1792.

Frédéric Rouille 

Frédéric Rouille is a captain of the Paris military and supporter of Germain. He is a leading figure in the Tenth of August and September Massacres, where he is assassinated by Arno.

Olivier 

Olivier is de la Serre's butler, and expresses sincere disdain for Arno.

Jean Lessard 

Jean Lessard (died 1794) is a Sans-culottes leader in Paris who is rejected by Marie Tussaud. During the revolution, Lessard tries to carry out his revenge against Tussaud, and sends his men to slay her. Tussaud escapes and sends Arno to eliminate Lessard.

Denis Molinier 

Denis Molinier is a French alchemist and a member of the French Templars, tasked with finding Nicolas Flamel's laboratory. Arno plots to find the lab before him, and steals one of his mechanisms, which open Flamel's lab. It is unknown what happened to him afterwards.

Marquis de Sade 

Donatien Alphonse François, Marquis de Sade (voiced by Alex Ivanovici) (2 June 1740 – 2 December 1814), commonly known as the Marquis de Sade, was a French aristocrat, revolutionary politician, philosopher, and author famous for his libertine sexuality.

He becomes the new Roi des Thunes after his predecessor is assassinated by Arno in 1791. He was held prisoner in the Bastille for several years, but is transferred to another prison shortly before angry Parisians storm the stronghold. Three years later, as Arno and Élise hunt Louis-Michel le Peletier, the pair enlist de Sade's knowledge of Parisian politics to find le Peletier's whereabouts.

François-Thomas Germain 

François-Thomas Germain (voiced by Julian Casey) (1726–1794) is a French silversmith, Sage, and Grand Master of the Parisian Rite of the Templar Order during the French Revolution. After experiencing visions of the First Civilization and reading the Codex Pater Intellectus, he takes it upon himself to reform the Order, which he believed had grown corrupt after aligning itself with the aristocracy for centuries. Inspired by Grand Master Jacques de Molay, Germain seeks to carry out the "Great Work" and create a capitalist society in which the Templars could more easily control the populace. De la Serre regards his ideas as being too radical, and exiles him from the Order. Germain turns de la Serre's advisors to his cause, forming a radical faction within the Templar Order. In 1789, he has de la Serre assassinated in the Palace of Versailles, taking most of the Order under his control. As the French Revolution breaks out, Germain and his followers exploit discontent with the monarchy and creates as much chaos as possible to crush the aristocracy and clergy, and instill fear in the populace of rising against the establishment again. The Templars hoard food and frame the royal family, eventually leading to the execution of King Louis XVI in 1793. Under the Templar Maximilien de Robespierre, the Reign of Terror brings the revolution to a violent and chaotic climax. Along the way, Élise opposes Germain. She and Arno eliminate Germain's followers and track him down to the Temple in 1794. After Germain kills Élise with a Sword of Eden, he is killed by Arno. In his final moments, Germain triggers a vision, telling Arno that his goals of reforming society and the Templar Order have already succeeded, even if he would not live to see the changes

Honore Gabriel Riqueti 

Honoré Gabriel Riqueti, comte de Mirabeau (voiced by Harry Standjofski) (1749–1791), better known as simply Mirabeau, is a French statesman, author, Mentor of the Assassin Council of the French Brotherhood, and leader of the French Revolution during its early stages. He criticizes France's arbitrary justice system and favors a constitutional monarchy built on the model of Great Britain, being a voice of moderation in the National Constituent Assembly. As Mentor of the Council and Brotherhood, Mirabeau seeks to establish peace with the Parisian Rite of the Templar Order and de la Serre, and inducts Arno Dorian into the Brotherhood. After a coup within the Templar Order, he is forced to give up on the truce until Élise offers to work with the Assassins in 1791. Unlike most of the council, he is eager to accept this offer. When he discovers that Mirabeau is a traitor to the Brotherhood, the Assassin Pierre Bellec poisons him. After his death, it is discovered that Mirabeau was serving King Louis XVI as an advisor in exchange for having his debts paid off. Public opinion turns against him, leading to his remains being moved away from the Panthéon. History views him as a complex man who is not easily understood. Pierre's decision to murder Mirabeau has also led subsequent Assassins to debate whether or not his attempts to reconcile with the Templars conflicted with the ideals of the Brotherhood.

Louis XVI 

Louis XVI (born Louis Auguste de France, also known as Louis Capet) (1754–1793) was King of France and Navarre from 1774 until 1791, after which he was subsequently King of the French from 1791 to 1792, before his deposition and execution during the French Revolution.

Maximilien Robespierre 

Maximilien François Marie Isidore de Robespierre (voiced by Bruce Dunmore) (1758–1794), often known as simply Maximilien Robespierre or Robespierre, is a French lawyer, politician and a member of the Templar Order. He is notable for starting the Reign of Terror during the French Revolution and abolishing slavery in France.

Napoléon Bonaparte 

Napoléon Bonaparte (voiced by Brent Skagford) (1769–1821) was a French military and political leader of Corsican descent who ruled first as the First Consul of France from 1799 to 1804, then as emperor from 1804 to 1815. He rose to power amidst the chaos and political turmoil of the French Revolution.

He is an acquaintance to Arno.

Characters of Assassin's Creed Syndicate

Jacob and Evie Frye 

Jacob Frye (9 November 1847 – unknown) and Evie Frye (9 November 1847 – unknown) are British Assassins who were active in Victorian London. Born at a time when the Assassin presence in London is virtually nonexistent, they fight to restore the Assassins to prominence in the city, crippling the Templar presence in the process. Jacob is voiced by Paul Amos, and Evie and is voiced by Victoria Atkin.

Galina Voronina 
Galina Voronina is a Russian Master Assassin. Like Desmond, she acquires most of her abilities by reliving her ancestors' memories in the Animus and taking advantage of the Bleeding effect. She is forced into the Animus by her mother, and eventually contacts the Assassin Gavin Banks for help. She is able to escape, but her sister dies and her mother commits suicide. After her prolonged exposure to the Animus, her mental health is compromised; Rebecca admits to seeing Galina believing she was conversing with her dead sister. A skilled assassin, Galina engages and defeats an Abstergo Sigma Team during Assassin's Creed Syndicate. She is about to kill Juhani, but is forced to cover Shaun and Rebecca's escape after the latter is shot.

Lydia Frye 
Lydia Frye (19 March 1893 – unknown) is a British Assassin operating in London during World War I, and is Jacob's granddaughter and Evie's grandniece. She crosses paths with Winston Churchill and assassinates Templar agents attempting to prolong the war, one of whom was a Sage. She appears within the Helix missions in Assassin's Creed Syndicate.

Henry Green 
Henry Green is the Indian-born leader of the British Assassins during the late 1860s. Born Jayadeep Mir, the son of Arbaaz Mir, he crosses paths with Evie and Jacob during their liberation of London in 1868, helping them in their final fight against Crawford Starrick and eventually marries Evie. As a child in India, he was trained by the twins' father, Ethan Frye.

Crawford Starrick 
Crawford Starrick (1827–1868) is the owner of Starrick Industries, and the Grand Master of the British Rite of the Templar Order by 1868. He appears in Assassin's Creed Syndicate. As an arrogant individual, he shows great disdain to those who tormented him and sees himself as a ruler among servants. Using his charm, he bends people to his will. After all the members of his inner circle are killed by Jacob and Evie, Crawford goes to the location of the Shroud of Eden, where he is killed by the twins.

Lucy Thorne 
Lucy Thorne (1837–1868) is a Templar and Grand Master Starrick's second-in-command. She is also the Order's expert on Pieces of Eden, and is tasked with finding the legendary Shroud of Eden. After fellow Templar Pearl Attaway is killed by Jacob, Lucy chases the twins for revenge, only to be assassinated by Evie.

Maxwell Roth 
Maxwell Roth (18?? – 1868) is the mastermind behind London's criminal underworld and one of Crawford's lieutenants. Although he is not a Templar, he trains several of Crawford's small-time gang leaders in return for a massive amount of money. After some of Crawford's lieutenants are killed, Maxwell proposes a partnership with Jacob's gang, betraying Crawford and helping Jacob's gangsters free the city. The partnership ends shortly after due to Maxwell's psychopathic behavior. When he intentionally burns down the Alhambra Music Hall, Jacob stabs him with his blade. In his final moments, Maxwell tells Jacob that he carried out the atrocities because he wanted and chose to do so.

Pearl Attaway 
Pearl Attaway is the owner of Attaway transport and, like her cousin, Grand Master Crawford Starrick, is a member of the British Templars. Pearl is business rivals with Malcolm Millner, another Templar. Crawford initially chooses Malcolm as the man controlling the bus transport, due to tensions with Pearl, but after she cooperates with Jacob, who does not know that she was a Templar, Crawford gives control to her and they both orchestrate Malcolm's elimination. Jacob discovers Pearl's true colors and kills her in her train station.

Rupert Ferris 
Rupert Ferris is the owner of Ferris Ironworks, a large steel-mill in the city of Croydon near London, effectively controlling the small city with his wealth. He is also one of Crawford's lieutenants. He is killed by Jacob Frye in his factory.

Philip Twopenny 
Philip Twopenny is the governor of the Bank of England and secret a member of the Templar Order. He orchestrates various robberies within the bank to fund the Templars, and in one of the raids, he is assassinated by Jacob with the help of inspector Abberline.

Charles Darwin 

Charles Darwin, born on 12 February 1809, was best known for his contributions and studies regarding the natural laws of evolution.

At some point, he meets Jacob and Evie.

Charles Dickens 

Charles Dickens (1812–1870) was an English writer and social critic. He meets Jacob and Evie, and asks for their help in solving crimes.

Karl Marx 

Karl Marx (1818–1883) was a German philosopher, economist, communist, sociologist, journalist, and revolutionary socialist. He asks Jacob and Evie to expand his unionistic ideas to the people of London.

Arthur Conan Doyle 

Sir Arthur Conan Doyle (22 May 1859 – 7 July 1930) was a Scottish writer and physician, famous for his fictional stories about the detective Sherlock Holmes. In 1868, as a young boy, his love for detective stories lead him to team up with the penny dreadful writer Henry Raymond, and Jacob and Evie to solve murders.

Alexander Graham Bell 

Alexander Graham Bell (1847–1922) was a Scottish-born scientist, inventor, engineer and innovator who was credited with inventing the first practical telephone. He was on friendly terms with Henry Green, who nicknamed him "Aleck".

Queen Victoria 

Queen Victoria (1819–1901), born Alexandrina Victoria of Kent, was the Queen of the United Kingdom of Great Britain and Ireland from 1837, and Empress of India from 1876, until her death.

Duleep Singh 

Duleep Singh (1838–1893), also known as Dalip Singh or the Black Prince of Perthshire, was the last Maharaja of the Sikh Empire and the youngest son of Ranjit Singh, ruling from 1843 to 1846. He is an associate of, and great-uncle to the Assassin Henry Green.

Jack the Ripper 

Jack, formerly known as Jack the Lad during his youth and widely feared as Jack the Ripper, was a member of the British Brotherhood of Assassins, active in the Whitechapel district of London up until 1888. Jack becomes infamous in 1888 following a series of gruesome murders of young women, who are fellow Assassins trying to stop his madness; these murders, in conjunction with Jack's control over London's criminal enterprise, threaten the existence of the Assassins in London. He is killed by Evie.

David Brewster 

David Brewster is a scientist working on a Piece of Eden at the behest of the Templar Order. He is assassinated by Evie, and his experiments on the Piece of Eden grow unstable, resulting in an explosion that buries his underground laboratory.

John Elliotson 

John Elliotson is a physician working in Lambeth Asylum and an associate of Crawford Starrick. Elliotson creates "Starrick's Soothing Syrup", a highly-addictive tonic made from opium and hallucinogens used to keep the working classes under control. He is assassinated by Jacob Frye, but his death floods the borough of Lambeth with counterfeit medicinal and sub-standard medical care.

James Brudenell 

James Brudenell, 7th Earl of Cardigan is a member of the House of Lords who opposes Benjamin Disraeli and the Corrupt Practices Act as he tries to keep political power in the hands of the nobility.

Florence Nightingale 

Florence Nightingale was an English social reformer, statistician and the founder of modern nursing. She is first encountered by Evie as the latter looks for help to treat Clara O'Dea.

Characters of Assassin's Creed Chronicles

Shao Jun 
Shao Jun (7 November 1505 – unknown) is a member of the Chinese Brotherhood of Assassins during the early 16th Century. She is a former concubine of the Zhengde Emperor, and is rescued by the Assassins after the emperor's death. As a result, she devotes her life to the Creed. Shao Jun appears in Assassin's Creed: Embers and Assassin's Creed Chronicles: China. She is voiced by Angela Galuppo in Assassin's Creed: Embers and Annabelle Galea in Assassin's Creed Chronicles: China. Her descendant, the Assassin Lin, portrayed by Michelle H. Lin, is depicted in the 2016 Assassin's Creed film.

Arbaaz Mir 
Arbaaz Mir (early 1800s – unknown) is a member of the Indian Brotherhood of Assassins during the 19th century, active during the time of the war between the Sikh Empire and the East India Company. Arbaaz is Jayadeep's father. He appears in Assassin's Creed Chronicles: India, and is voiced by Johnny Neal.

Nikolai Andreievich Orelov 
Nikolai Andreievich Orelov (late 1800s – 1928) is a member of the Russian Brotherhood of Assassins during the late 19th and early 20th centuries. Nikolai is notably involved in events such as the Borki train disaster and the Tunguska explosion, and spearheads the hunt for the Imperial Sceptre of the Russian royal family with aid from Nikola Tesla. He leaves the Brotherhood out of fear for his and his family's safety and is hunted down by Assassins working for the FBI after he kills one of them in a fit of paranoid madness after they attempt to convince him to return to the Brotherhood with his son, Innokenti. Orelov appears in Assassin's Creed Chronicles: Russia.

Characters of Assassin's Creed Origins

Bayek 

Bayek of Siwa (portrayed by Abubakar Salim) is a Medjay and Assassin operating in the Ptolemaic Kingdom around 49 BCE, who appears in Assassin's Creed Origins. Bayek possesses a symbiotic relationship with the eagle, Senu, which allows him to see the world through its eyes—a more literal predecessor to the Eagle Vision of later Assassins. He is also regarded as the founder of the organized Assassin Order.

Aya 
Aya of Alexandria, later known as Amunet, is a co-founder of the Hidden Ones – the precursors to the Assassin Brotherhood – and Bayek's wife during the Hellenistic period of the Ptolemaic dynasty. On 12 August 30 BCE, Amunet infiltrates Cleopatra VII's palace, where she kills the last pharaoh of Ancient Egypt with an asp. By the Renaissance, Amunet is respected as a great Assassin by the Assassin Brotherhood, and a statue of her is placed in the Assassin Sanctuary of Monteriggioni. Around this time, a shrine in her honor is created at the Basilica di San Marco in Venice, Italy, which is believed to be her actual burial site until her mummy is found in the same cave as Bayek's. It has since been confirmed that the sarcophagus in Venice does not contain Amunet's remains. Amunet is also the direct descendant of Kassandra, the canonical protagonist of Assassin's Creed Odyssey and her son Elpidios.

Cleopatra 

Cleopatra VII Thea Philopator (69 BCE – 12 August 30 BCE), commonly known as Cleopatra, is the last Egyptian pharaoh and a member of the Ptolemaic dynasty. She initially shares power with her father, and later, her brothers, whom she marries. With the help of the Templars, she becomes the sole ruler of Egypt, and an ally of Julius Caesar. After Caesar's death, she allies herself with Mark Antony, with whom she has a relationship with. In 30 BCE, Antony commits suicide at the Battle of Actium, and Cleopatra is assassinated by Amunet with an asp.

Julius Caesar 

Gaius Julius Caesar (13 July 100 BCE – 15 March 44 BCE), commonly known as Julius Caesar was a prominent general in the Roman army and notable politician. He is killed for his Templar affiliations.

Ptolemy XIII 

Ptolemy XIII Theos Philopator (62 BCE – 47 BCE) was a pharaoh of Egypt and a member of the Ptolemaic dynasty, ruling alongside his older sister and wife Cleopatra VII from 51 BCE until his death.

Marcus Junius Brutus 

Marcus Junius Brutus (early June 85 BCE – late October 42 BCE), more commonly known simply as Brutus, is a politician of the late Roman Republic, and a member of the Roman Republic and Order of Assassins. Brutus is one of the masterminds behind the assassination conspiracy against Julius Caesar in 44 BCE. He is also the first known human to discover the Colosseum Vault.

Cassius 

Gaius Cassius Longinus (c. 85 BCE – 3 October 42 BCE), commonly known as Cassius, is an Assassin, a Roman senator, and Brutus's brother-in-law. On 15 March 44 BCE, Cassius was part of the group Senators who stabbed Julius Caesar.

Characters of Assassin's Creed Odyssey

Alexios and Kassandra 

Alexios and Kassandra are siblings, one of whom is chosen by the player to be the protagonist (referred to as the Eagle Bearer) of Assassin's Creed Odyssey. They are Spartan Greek mercenaries who are descended from King Leonidas of Sparta, and fight for both the Delian and Peloponnesian Leagues during the Peloponnesian War. The sibling not chosen appears as a secondary character in the game known as Deimos. The Eagle Bearer eventually inherits the Staff of Hermes Trismegistus from Pythagoras, a powerful Isu artifact sought by Layla Hassan.

Barnabas 
Barnabas is a Greek naval captain active during the Peloponnesian War. After he is rescued from the thug leader known as the Cyclops in Kephallonia by the Eagle Bearer, he offers the command of his ship, The Adrestia, and his crew. In his youth, Barnabas was a soldier before turning to commercial shipping for a livelihood. In this capacity, he developed a network of contacts throughout Greece, including local leaders and mercenaries, who becomes a primary source of information for the Eagle Bearer.

Herodotos 

Herodotos (c. 484 BCE – c. 425 BCE), also spelled Herodotus, was one of the earliest Greek historians who hails from the island of Samos, off the coast of Anatolia. In Odyssey, Herodotos becomes a companion of the Eagle Bearer, and documents their ordeals during the Peloponnesian War. The record is lost to humanity until it is rediscovered by Layla Hassan.

King Leonidas of Sparta 

Leonidas I (c. 540 BCE – 480 BCE) was a warrior king of the Greek city-state of Sparta, best known for his involvement in the Battle of Thermopylae against the Persian Empire in 480 BCE. In Odyssey, Leonidas is a direct descendant of the Isu, and wielded an Isu spear, which was later passed down to his daughter and eventually the grandchild known as the Eagle Bearer.

Myrrine 
Myrrine, also known as the Phoenix while in exile, is the wife of Nikolaos, the mother of Alexios and Kassandra, and the daughter of King Leonidas of Sparta. She gives her eldest child the broken Spear of Leonidas, an Isu artifact and the family heirloom which she had inherited after Leonidas' death.

Nikolaos 
Nikolaos of Sparta, also known as the Wolf of Sparta, is a Spartan general and Myrrine's husband. Because of Myrinne's heritage, Nikolaos has high hopes for her children due to their grandfather's fame and valor. However, an Oracle prophesies the potential destruction of Sparta at the hands of Myrrine's youngest, infant child. After the apparent death of an Elder as a result of the elder child's actions, Nikolaos reluctantly stood by a death sentence ordered by the other Spartan leaders and personally attempts to carry it out, only for the child to survive the fall from Mount Taygetos, and, in exile, grow up to become a legendary mercenary.

Cult of Kosmos 
The Cult of Kosmos, a secretive cabal operating throughout Ancient Greece and the surrounding regions, are the overarching antagonists of Odyssey. The Cult operates in branches comprising several Adepts, with each brand led by an individual dubbed as a Sage, who are often prominent members within various levels of society in the Classical Greek world. Like their Egyptian counterparts, the Order of the Ancients, and the modern day Templar Order, the Cult of Kosmos are not polytheistic, and have a deistic belief system. They manipulate the Greek world to maintain their power and wealth. Some members of the Cult idolize and worship the people within the Bloodline and truly believe that they are actual demigods, such as Deimos. The members of the Cult grow chaotic and greedy, and use the Chaos to earn massive amounts of profit and political power.

Darius 
Artabanus, better known by his alias Darius, is a member of the Persian elite within the Achaemenid Empire, whose philosophy and combat tactics eventually form the basis of the Hidden Ones and its successor, the Brotherhood of Assassins. He is based on the historical figure Artabanus of Persia. In the 5th century BCE, the Order of the Ancients, an antecedent organization to the Templars, supports the reigns and regional conquests of the Achaemenid kings Darius I and his son Xerxes I. Using a newly created weapon known as the Hidden Blade, which becomes the Assassins' iconic signature weapon, Darius personally assassinates King Xerxes I and flees Persia with his surviving child afterwards. While the character is originally referenced and mentioned in Assassin's Creed II, Darius makes his first series appearance in the Assassin's Creed Odyssey's DLC pack, Legacy of the First Blade, where he encounters the Eagle Bearer. They work together to thwart the Order of the Ancients' activities in the Greek world, and Darius later becomes the father-in-law of the Eagle Bearer. By the ending of Legacy of the First Blade, Darius relocates to Egypt with his grandson Elpidios and raises him alone as the boy's guardian and mentor.

Characters of Assassin's Creed Valhalla

Eivor Varinsdottir 

Eivor Varinsdottir (voiced by Cecilie Stenspil as a female and by Magnus Bruun as a male) is a Scandinavian Viking raider living in Norway around 873 AD. Alongside her adoptive brother, Sigurd Styrbjornsson, Eivor leads a group of Vikings to settle in England where they come into conflict with the Anglo-Saxon kingdoms. Over the course of their journey, they meet the Hidden Ones and join the fight against the Order of the Ancients. Within her body resides the reincarnated consciousness of the Isu ruler Odin.

Sigurd Styrbjornsson 
Sigurd Styrbjornsson (voiced by Gudmundur Thorvaldsson) is a Scandinavian Viking raider, the adoptive brother of Eivor.

Randvi 
Randvi (voiced by  Kajsa Mohammar) is a Norse woman who serves as chief advisor to the Raven Clan's settlement of Ravensthorpe. She is Sigurd's wife.

Characters of Assassin's Creed Mirage

Basim Ibn Ishaq 
Basim Ibn Ishaq (voiced by Carlo Rota in Assassin's Creed Valhalla and by Lee Majdoub in Assassin's Creed Mirage) is the protagonist of Assassin's Creed Mirage, first introduced as a supporting character and hidden antagonist in Assassin's Creed Valhalla, before becoming the protagonist of its modern-day section. Born in Samarra during the 9th century, Basim is the son of the architect responsible for the creation of the Great Mosque of Samarra, though his father was exiled and died in poverty after someone else took credit for his work. Orphaned and alone, Basim becomes a small-time thief to survive on the streets of Baghdad until meeting the Hidden One Roshan, who inducts him into the Brotherhood and becomes his mentor, though the two would eventually have a falling out, resulting in Roshan leaving the Hidden Ones. Later in life, Basim would become a mentor himself, taking Hytham as his first apprentice, and discovers he is the reincarnation of the Isu Loki, who betrayed his fellow Isu after Odin imprisoned his and Aletheia's son, Fenrir. Seeking revenge against the reincarnation of Odin on Loki's behalf, Basim meets Sigurd Styrbjornsson in Constantinople and, believing him to be Odin's reincarnation, accompanies him back to Norway, where he meets Sigurd's adoptive sister, Eivor Varinsdottir. Realizing Sigurd is actually the reincarnation of Tyr and Eivor is Odin's reincarnation, Basim formulates a plan to win their trust and accompanies them to England, where he and Hytham train Eivor in the Hidden Ones' ways and enlist her help in eliminating the local branch of the Order of the Ancients. After finding a Piece of Eden, the Saga Stone, Basim uses it to awaken Tyr's dormant memories in Sigurd, causing a rift in his and Eivor's friendship, and eventually follows the pair to an Isu temple in Norway, where he reveals his true intentions to kill Eivor. However, Basim is defeated by Eivor and Sigurd and trapped in the Grey, the Isu's simulated afterlife, where he remains until 2020, when Loki and Aletheia's longtime plan finally comes to fruition and Basim is freed by Layla Hassan in exchange for helping her save the planet from certain doom. Basim subsequently abandons Layla in the Grey and rejuvenates his physical body using the Staff of Hermes Trismegistus, which was brought by Layla and contains Aletheia's consciousness. He then meets the modern-day Assassins and agrees to help them in their continued fight against the Templar Order, while secretly planning to find Loki's missing children.

Roshan 
Roshan (voiced by Shohreh Aghdashloo) is a former slave-turned-Master Assassin and Basim Ibn Ishaq's mentor, who inducted him into the Hidden Ones after saving him from several city guards in Baghdad. However, the two would eventually have a falling out, resulting in Roshan leaving the Hidden Ones and their fortress headquarters at Alamut, though she remains loyal to the Creed and continues to fight the Order of the Ancients' influence across the globe. In the late 9th century, while tracking an Order member named Al-Si'la to England, Roshan encounters Eivor Varinsdottir, who helps her kill Al-Si'la and her puppet, the so-called "Earl of Westerna", Edward, who had threatened Eivor's clan. Roshan then retrieves a scroll from Al-Si'la's body, which she claims to be a "seed" to be planted in Jerusalem, and parts ways with Eivor, leaving England to continue her mission.

Other characters in the Assassin's Creed series

Characters of Assassin's Creed (film) 
After the sequel to Assassin's Creed was canceled, its narrative was continued in Assassin's Creed Origins and the Layla Hassan saga as a whole, with the inclusion of Marion Cotillard as Dr. Sofia Rikkin, an original character from the film, the film itself having continued Arno and Baptiste's storylines from Assassin's Creed Unity and Assassin's Creed III: Liberation, respectively.

Callum Lynch 
Callum Lynch (portrayed by Michael Fassbender) (b. 1979) is a descendant of Aguilar de Nerha, a Spanish Assassin. After being rescued from his own execution by Abstergo, he is placed in the Animus to relive the memories of Aguilar and find the Apple of Eden. After reconciling with his father, who murdered his mother to keep her out of Templar hands, he joins the Assassin Order, retrieves the Apple, and kills Alan Rikkin.

Aguilar de Nerha 
Aguilar de Nerha (portrayed by Michael Fassbender) is a Spanish Assassin and ancestor to Callum Lynch. During the Spanish Inquisition, he attempts to protect the son of Sultan Muhammad XII of Granada, an ally of the Assassins who possessed an Apple of Eden. He manages to escape with the Apple and passes it on to Christopher Columbus for protection.

Sofia Rikkin 
Sofia Rikkin (portrayed by Marion Cotillard) is a scientist and the head of the Abstergo Foundation Rehabilitation Center in Madrid. She is also Alan's daughter, and the two have a difficult relationship. In October 2016, Sofia comes into contact with Callum. During their time together the pair form a connection, but when Callum's escape from the Foundation leads to him killing Alan, she dedicates herself to chasing down her father's killer.

Alan Rikkin 
Alan Rikkin (portrayed by Jeremy Irons) (c. 1951 – 14 December 2016) is the CEO of Abstergo Industries and a member of the Inner Sanctum of the Templar Order. He originally had a minor role in the first game, where he sent several e-mails to Warren Vidic, one of which detailed several Pieces of Eden that the Templars believed to be nothing more than mythical tales, including the Holy Grail. In the film, he is depicted as the head of Abstergo's subsidiary organization, the Abstergo Foundation, and seeks to find the Apple of Eden through Aguilar de Nerha's memories. He eventually recovers the Apple from Christopher Columbus's tomb and attempts to perform a ritual to remove human free will, but is assassinated by Cal Lynch, who steals the Apple.

Maria 
Maria (portrayed by Ariane Labed) is a member of the Spanish Brotherhood of Assassins during the 15th century, as well as a close ally of Master Assassin Aguilar de Nerha. In 1492, she and her fellow Assassins seek to prevent Prince Ahmed of Granada from being captured by the Templars, fearing that his father, Sultan Muhammad XII of Granada, would relinquish the Apple of Eden in his possession in exchange for his son's safety.

Alicia Vikander was originally considered for the role of Maria, but scheduling conflicts with Jason Bourne eventually caused the actress to drop out, with Ariane Labed being cast instead.

Tomás de Torquemada 

Tomás de Torquemada (portrayed by Javier Gutiérrez) is a Spanish Dominican friar, the first Inquisitor General of Spain, and confessor to Isabella I of Castile. He is depicted as a high-ranking a member of the Spanish Rite of the Templar Order. Under the influence of Rodrigo Borgia, Grand Master of the Italian Templars and Papal candidate, Torquemada opposes the Spanish Assassin Brotherhood, and persecutes them as part of the Spanish Inquisition.

Isu (major characters)

Minerva 

Minerva (voiced by Margaret Easley), also known as Merva or Mera, is the first a member of the Isu, otherwise known as the "First Civilization", introduced in the series. She is a member of the Capitoline Triad, a renowned scientific group, along with Juno and Jupiter. In Assassin's Creed II, Minerva appears to Ezio via a pre-recorded hologram inside the Vatican Vault in 1499. Knowing that Desmond will eventually relive Ezio's memories, Minerva uses the latter as a conduit to pass on her message. She explains that her kind are not gods, but a more advanced civilization whose technology was mistaken for magic. They engineered humans as slaves, but they rebelled. Minerva describes how war with humanity, combined with a devastating cataclysmic event, led to the downfall of their civilization and the extinction of their race. She correctly predicted that a second cataclysmic event would eventually occur, and she hid away the tools humanity would need to survive in several vaults around the world, devising a system by which they could communicate across time before they eventually died. She instructs Desmond to find the vaults, then disappears, leaving a confused Ezio in her wake.

In Assassin's Creed III, she projects herself through the past one last time and finds Desmond in the Vault. She warns him about Juno's power-hungry ambitions, hoping that he will decide not to save the world and keep Juno imprisoned. Juno turns the tables and forces Minerva to reveal Desmond's destiny and how his legacy will be manipulated if he allows the cataclysm to happen. During her own natural lifetime, Minerva—known to adherents of Norse mythology as Gunlodr—met with the Isu leader Odin and played an unwitting part in his plot to survive the Great Catastrophe.

Juno 

Juno (voiced by Nadia Verrucci), alternately known as Uni, is a member of the Capitoline Triad introduced in Assassin's Creed: Brotherhood. Although she reiterates Minerva's warning to Desmond, she is far more hostile and contemptuous of humanity. After Desmond recovers an Apple of Eden hidden by Ezio in the Roman Colosseum, Juno takes control of Desmond, forces him to kill Lucy, and instructs him to find "the one who would accompany you through the gate". In Assassins Creed III, after Desmond kills Warren and Daniel, she takes the place of the modern-day main antagonist. It is revealed that Juno sought to conquer the rejuvenating world. When she tried to use Minerva's technology for her own ends, she was found and imprisoned in the Vault, with the other two members of the Triad hoping that she would fade away in time for the devices there to be activated safely. However, she endured, and she confronts Desmond and Minerva when the time comes to use the device. Juno spurs Minerva into showing the inevitable future if Desmond does not activate the device: humanity will start out well, and then sink back into their old ways and repeat the cycle all over again. Desmond decides to use the device, preventing the apocalypse, even though this would release Juno and cost him his life. Juno is released, and thanks Desmond's body before leaving her prison. She reappears later in Assassin's Creed Syndicate, where she ascends to leadership of the Instruments of the First Will, a sect of Isu worshippers who are loyal to her search for a way to restore her physical form. Juno was killed by Charlotte de la Cruz after gaining a physical form. During her own natural lifetime, Juno—known to adherents of Norse mythology as Hyrrokin—met with Odin and willingly aided him in his plot to survive the Great Catastrophe in exchange for assistance in restoring to life her lost love, Aita.

Jupiter 

Jupiter (voiced by Peter Renaday), also known as Tinia, is a member of the Capitoline Triad. He appears to Desmond in Assassin's Creed: Revelations during the Nexus of Time. He elaborates more on the creation of the vaults, and shows the location of the central vault that contains all their accumulated knowledge. Although the humans tend to use his Roman name, Minerva refers to him by his Etruscan name, Tinia. During his own natural lifetime, Jupiter—known to adherents of Norse mythology as Suttungr—led a faction of Isu that Norse mythology would come to know as the Jötunheimr, or "giants". At one point the Jotunheimr waged war with an opposing faction of Isu known as the Aesir, led by Odin. Despite this, Jupiter welcomed his Aesir counterpart during the latter's visit to his realm and hosted a feast in his honor.

Aita 

Aita was Juno's husband who volunteered to be a test subject for one of the Capitoline Triad's attempts to preserve the First Civilization. The experiment that he took part in is left vague, but Juno suggests that it preserved his body at the cost of his mind. Juno euthanized him when his mind "became brittle". He appears in Assassin's Creed IV: Black Flag as Bartholomew and John; Bartholomew is killed by Edward, while John commits suicide by forcing Abstergo security to shoot him; the latter's body is then taken by Abstergo to use in the Phoenix Project. Aita is subsequently reborn as the Sage in the form of Jacques de Molay and François-Thomas Germain in Assassin's Creed Unity, and an unnamed German spymaster working in London during the events of Assassin's Creed Syndicate. As Germain, he attempts to purge the Templar Order of complacency and restore its original purpose. As the German spymaster, his objectives are unknown, but as he is assassinated by Lydia Frye relatively quickly, it is noted that he was a particularly ineffective Sage. As the Sage, Aita is closely tied to the Instruments of the First Will, a cult worshipping Juno that believes humanity should be subservient to the Precursor race. Aita is the Etruscan name for Hades and Pluto.

Aletheia 

Aletheia, known to adherents of Norse mythology as Angrboda, is an apparent sympathizer to the humans. She criticizes her fellow Isu for their treatment of their "useful apes", and reveals her disdain for their artifacts made to control the human populace. Trying to convince other Isu to join her cause, she praises the humans' achievements, among which includes the development of democracy and diplomacy. She implores the others to stop cowering before renouncing her position, not wanting to "be part of [their] exploitation" anymore. Before her death, she digitizes her consciousness into the Staff of Hermes Trismegistus, so that she can commune with Layla Hassan in the present and guide her on the path to become the "Heir of Memories". It is eventually revealed that Aletheia's actions were all part of a plot for her to reunite with her lover Loki, and to obtain vengeance against Odin for the imprisonment of their son Fenrir.

Odin 

Odin, sometimes known as Havi, is an Isu ruler and leader of the Aesir, a nation of the Isu, in the years leading up to the Great Catastrophe. Introduced in Assassin's Creed Valhalla, Odin is determined to avoid his own fated death during the Great Catastrophe, known to the Aesir as Ragnarök. Selfish and deceitful, but loyal, Odin's obsession with avoiding his fated death causes him to imprison Loki's son Fenrir, and betray his brother, Tyr. With Juno's assistance, Odin succeeds in finding a way for him and a few trusted followers to survive Ragnarok through reincarnation. Odin is reincarnated in Eivor Varinsdottir, a 9th-century Viking raider who becomes embroiled in the Assassin – Templar conflict central to the series.

Tyr 

Tyr is an Isu a member of the Aesir nation and close friend to Odin. Chief lawgiver of the Aesir, Tyr works tirelessly to keep the peace between Odin and Loki, the latter having betrayed the Aesir by fathering the child Fenrir with Aletheia. Tyr is betrayed by Odin during Fenrir's imprisonment, and loses an arm in the process, but he is among Odin's counted few to be reincarnated after Ragnarök. He is eventually reincarnated in Sigurd Styrbjornsson, the adopted brother of Eivor Varinsdottir.

Loki 

Loki (voiced by Carlo Rota) is an Isu a member of the Aesir nation and Aletheia's lover. As Fenrir's father, he seeks vengeance against Odin for his son's imprisonment. After betraying Odin, Loki is forbidden from joining his fellow Aesir in reincarnating after Ragnarök, but he formulates a plan with Aletheia that will allow them both to survive the coming catastrophe; while Aletheia transfers her consciousness into the Staff of Hermes Trismegistus, Loki uses the same device used by the other Aesir to reincarnate in the body of Basim Ibn Ishaq, who retains all of Loki's memories.

References

Bibliography 

 
 
 
 

Assassins Creed